

368001–368100 

|-bgcolor=#d6d6d6
| 368001 ||  || — || September 29, 2003 || Kitt Peak || Spacewatch || THM || align=right | 2.8 km || 
|-id=002 bgcolor=#d6d6d6
| 368002 ||  || — || January 27, 2006 || Mount Lemmon || Mount Lemmon Survey || — || align=right | 3.7 km || 
|-id=003 bgcolor=#d6d6d6
| 368003 ||  || — || January 26, 2006 || Mount Lemmon || Mount Lemmon Survey || THM || align=right | 2.5 km || 
|-id=004 bgcolor=#E9E9E9
| 368004 ||  || — || October 24, 2005 || Kitt Peak || Spacewatch || AGN || align=right | 1.5 km || 
|-id=005 bgcolor=#d6d6d6
| 368005 ||  || — || November 16, 2009 || Mount Lemmon || Mount Lemmon Survey || — || align=right | 2.7 km || 
|-id=006 bgcolor=#E9E9E9
| 368006 ||  || — || September 29, 2005 || Mount Lemmon || Mount Lemmon Survey || — || align=right | 1.8 km || 
|-id=007 bgcolor=#E9E9E9
| 368007 ||  || — || March 24, 2003 || Kitt Peak || Spacewatch || — || align=right | 1.9 km || 
|-id=008 bgcolor=#E9E9E9
| 368008 ||  || — || December 31, 2002 || Kitt Peak || Spacewatch || — || align=right | 1.5 km || 
|-id=009 bgcolor=#E9E9E9
| 368009 ||  || — || December 18, 2001 || Socorro || LINEAR || — || align=right | 3.2 km || 
|-id=010 bgcolor=#d6d6d6
| 368010 ||  || — || February 26, 2007 || Kitt Peak || Spacewatch || — || align=right | 4.2 km || 
|-id=011 bgcolor=#E9E9E9
| 368011 ||  || — || November 17, 1998 || Kitt Peak || Spacewatch || — || align=right | 2.0 km || 
|-id=012 bgcolor=#d6d6d6
| 368012 ||  || — || December 22, 2005 || Kitt Peak || Spacewatch || — || align=right | 2.5 km || 
|-id=013 bgcolor=#E9E9E9
| 368013 ||  || — || October 30, 2005 || Kitt Peak || Spacewatch || HOF || align=right | 2.6 km || 
|-id=014 bgcolor=#E9E9E9
| 368014 ||  || — || March 28, 2008 || Mount Lemmon || Mount Lemmon Survey || — || align=right data-sort-value="0.82" | 820 m || 
|-id=015 bgcolor=#E9E9E9
| 368015 ||  || — || October 27, 2005 || Kitt Peak || Spacewatch || — || align=right | 2.5 km || 
|-id=016 bgcolor=#E9E9E9
| 368016 ||  || — || November 3, 2010 || Mount Lemmon || Mount Lemmon Survey || — || align=right | 2.9 km || 
|-id=017 bgcolor=#d6d6d6
| 368017 ||  || — || January 9, 2006 || Kitt Peak || Spacewatch || EOS || align=right | 4.5 km || 
|-id=018 bgcolor=#E9E9E9
| 368018 ||  || — || March 11, 2003 || Kitt Peak || Spacewatch || — || align=right | 2.8 km || 
|-id=019 bgcolor=#E9E9E9
| 368019 ||  || — || March 24, 2003 || Kitt Peak || Spacewatch || NEM || align=right | 2.7 km || 
|-id=020 bgcolor=#E9E9E9
| 368020 ||  || — || August 27, 2000 || Cerro Tololo || M. W. Buie || — || align=right | 3.4 km || 
|-id=021 bgcolor=#d6d6d6
| 368021 ||  || — || January 10, 2000 || Kitt Peak || Spacewatch || EOS || align=right | 2.8 km || 
|-id=022 bgcolor=#d6d6d6
| 368022 ||  || — || January 8, 2006 || Catalina || CSS || — || align=right | 5.2 km || 
|-id=023 bgcolor=#E9E9E9
| 368023 ||  || — || September 23, 2005 || Kitt Peak || Spacewatch || — || align=right | 2.2 km || 
|-id=024 bgcolor=#d6d6d6
| 368024 ||  || — || October 11, 2005 || Kitt Peak || Spacewatch || — || align=right | 3.4 km || 
|-id=025 bgcolor=#d6d6d6
| 368025 ||  || — || September 22, 2003 || Kitt Peak || Spacewatch || HYG || align=right | 3.3 km || 
|-id=026 bgcolor=#E9E9E9
| 368026 ||  || — || October 31, 2005 || Mount Lemmon || Mount Lemmon Survey || GEF || align=right | 1.4 km || 
|-id=027 bgcolor=#d6d6d6
| 368027 ||  || — || January 23, 2006 || Kitt Peak || Spacewatch || — || align=right | 2.9 km || 
|-id=028 bgcolor=#d6d6d6
| 368028 ||  || — || January 23, 2006 || Kitt Peak || Spacewatch || — || align=right | 3.0 km || 
|-id=029 bgcolor=#E9E9E9
| 368029 ||  || — || April 9, 2003 || Palomar || NEAT || WIT || align=right | 1.3 km || 
|-id=030 bgcolor=#d6d6d6
| 368030 ||  || — || December 18, 2004 || Mount Lemmon || Mount Lemmon Survey || — || align=right | 3.6 km || 
|-id=031 bgcolor=#E9E9E9
| 368031 ||  || — || August 18, 2009 || Kitt Peak || Spacewatch || WIT || align=right | 1.2 km || 
|-id=032 bgcolor=#fefefe
| 368032 ||  || — || September 15, 2010 || Kitt Peak || Spacewatch || — || align=right data-sort-value="0.89" | 890 m || 
|-id=033 bgcolor=#E9E9E9
| 368033 ||  || — || October 30, 2005 || Mount Lemmon || Mount Lemmon Survey || WIT || align=right | 1.0 km || 
|-id=034 bgcolor=#d6d6d6
| 368034 ||  || — || April 27, 2001 || Kitt Peak || Spacewatch || — || align=right | 4.1 km || 
|-id=035 bgcolor=#d6d6d6
| 368035 ||  || — || September 17, 2003 || Kitt Peak || Spacewatch || — || align=right | 2.7 km || 
|-id=036 bgcolor=#d6d6d6
| 368036 ||  || — || November 22, 2009 || Catalina || CSS || EOS || align=right | 2.3 km || 
|-id=037 bgcolor=#d6d6d6
| 368037 ||  || — || August 20, 2003 || Campo Imperatore || CINEOS || EOS || align=right | 2.1 km || 
|-id=038 bgcolor=#d6d6d6
| 368038 ||  || — || April 11, 2007 || Kitt Peak || Spacewatch || — || align=right | 2.6 km || 
|-id=039 bgcolor=#d6d6d6
| 368039 ||  || — || November 23, 2009 || Mount Lemmon || Mount Lemmon Survey || EOS || align=right | 2.2 km || 
|-id=040 bgcolor=#d6d6d6
| 368040 ||  || — || December 13, 1999 || Kitt Peak || Spacewatch || — || align=right | 3.6 km || 
|-id=041 bgcolor=#d6d6d6
| 368041 ||  || — || January 11, 2011 || Mount Lemmon || Mount Lemmon Survey || — || align=right | 3.0 km || 
|-id=042 bgcolor=#d6d6d6
| 368042 ||  || — || January 15, 2005 || Kitt Peak || Spacewatch || — || align=right | 3.3 km || 
|-id=043 bgcolor=#E9E9E9
| 368043 ||  || — || March 31, 2003 || Kitt Peak || Spacewatch || WIT || align=right | 3.2 km || 
|-id=044 bgcolor=#d6d6d6
| 368044 ||  || — || December 12, 2004 || Kitt Peak || Spacewatch || VER || align=right | 4.1 km || 
|-id=045 bgcolor=#d6d6d6
| 368045 ||  || — || January 10, 2011 || Catalina || CSS || EOS || align=right | 2.5 km || 
|-id=046 bgcolor=#d6d6d6
| 368046 ||  || — || September 27, 2003 || Kitt Peak || Spacewatch || — || align=right | 3.8 km || 
|-id=047 bgcolor=#E9E9E9
| 368047 ||  || — || April 12, 1999 || Kitt Peak || Spacewatch || — || align=right | 1.6 km || 
|-id=048 bgcolor=#E9E9E9
| 368048 ||  || — || October 2, 2009 || Mount Lemmon || Mount Lemmon Survey || — || align=right | 3.0 km || 
|-id=049 bgcolor=#E9E9E9
| 368049 ||  || — || February 25, 2007 || Mount Lemmon || Mount Lemmon Survey || AGN || align=right | 1.4 km || 
|-id=050 bgcolor=#E9E9E9
| 368050 ||  || — || February 21, 2003 || Palomar || NEAT || — || align=right | 1.6 km || 
|-id=051 bgcolor=#d6d6d6
| 368051 ||  || — || September 5, 2008 || Kitt Peak || Spacewatch || EUP || align=right | 3.1 km || 
|-id=052 bgcolor=#d6d6d6
| 368052 ||  || — || June 9, 2007 || Catalina || CSS || — || align=right | 5.0 km || 
|-id=053 bgcolor=#E9E9E9
| 368053 ||  || — || January 27, 2007 || Mount Lemmon || Mount Lemmon Survey || — || align=right | 2.3 km || 
|-id=054 bgcolor=#E9E9E9
| 368054 ||  || — || October 19, 2000 || Kitt Peak || Spacewatch || HOF || align=right | 2.6 km || 
|-id=055 bgcolor=#d6d6d6
| 368055 ||  || — || March 22, 1996 || Kitt Peak || Spacewatch || — || align=right | 2.8 km || 
|-id=056 bgcolor=#d6d6d6
| 368056 ||  || — || May 11, 2007 || Kitt Peak || Spacewatch || — || align=right | 3.9 km || 
|-id=057 bgcolor=#E9E9E9
| 368057 ||  || — || November 4, 2005 || Mount Lemmon || Mount Lemmon Survey || WIT || align=right | 1.2 km || 
|-id=058 bgcolor=#E9E9E9
| 368058 ||  || — || December 14, 2001 || Socorro || LINEAR || GEF || align=right | 1.5 km || 
|-id=059 bgcolor=#E9E9E9
| 368059 ||  || — || March 11, 2007 || Kitt Peak || Spacewatch || HOF || align=right | 3.1 km || 
|-id=060 bgcolor=#E9E9E9
| 368060 ||  || — || May 23, 2003 || Kitt Peak || Spacewatch || HOF || align=right | 2.7 km || 
|-id=061 bgcolor=#d6d6d6
| 368061 ||  || — || October 24, 2005 || Mauna Kea || A. Boattini || — || align=right | 2.7 km || 
|-id=062 bgcolor=#d6d6d6
| 368062 ||  || — || December 3, 2004 || Anderson Mesa || LONEOS || — || align=right | 3.9 km || 
|-id=063 bgcolor=#d6d6d6
| 368063 ||  || — || October 24, 2003 || Apache Point || SDSS || — || align=right | 3.1 km || 
|-id=064 bgcolor=#E9E9E9
| 368064 ||  || — || February 10, 2002 || Socorro || LINEAR || MRX || align=right | 1.3 km || 
|-id=065 bgcolor=#E9E9E9
| 368065 ||  || — || November 5, 2010 || Mount Lemmon || Mount Lemmon Survey || — || align=right | 1.2 km || 
|-id=066 bgcolor=#E9E9E9
| 368066 ||  || — || January 28, 2007 || Catalina || CSS || ADE || align=right | 2.0 km || 
|-id=067 bgcolor=#E9E9E9
| 368067 ||  || — || March 1, 2011 || Kitt Peak || Spacewatch || — || align=right | 3.1 km || 
|-id=068 bgcolor=#d6d6d6
| 368068 ||  || — || September 28, 1997 || Kitt Peak || Spacewatch || — || align=right | 4.0 km || 
|-id=069 bgcolor=#E9E9E9
| 368069 ||  || — || April 2, 1995 || Kitt Peak || Spacewatch || — || align=right | 1.3 km || 
|-id=070 bgcolor=#d6d6d6
| 368070 ||  || — || October 22, 2003 || Anderson Mesa || LONEOS || ALA || align=right | 5.6 km || 
|-id=071 bgcolor=#E9E9E9
| 368071 ||  || — || November 25, 2005 || Catalina || CSS || — || align=right | 1.8 km || 
|-id=072 bgcolor=#d6d6d6
| 368072 ||  || — || October 18, 2009 || Mount Lemmon || Mount Lemmon Survey || — || align=right | 2.6 km || 
|-id=073 bgcolor=#d6d6d6
| 368073 ||  || — || November 10, 2009 || Kitt Peak || Spacewatch || — || align=right | 3.0 km || 
|-id=074 bgcolor=#E9E9E9
| 368074 ||  || — || August 18, 2009 || Kitt Peak || Spacewatch || — || align=right | 2.8 km || 
|-id=075 bgcolor=#d6d6d6
| 368075 ||  || — || December 27, 1999 || Kitt Peak || Spacewatch || — || align=right | 4.3 km || 
|-id=076 bgcolor=#d6d6d6
| 368076 ||  || — || May 9, 2007 || Kitt Peak || Spacewatch || — || align=right | 3.7 km || 
|-id=077 bgcolor=#E9E9E9
| 368077 ||  || — || July 29, 2000 || Anderson Mesa || LONEOS || — || align=right | 1.4 km || 
|-id=078 bgcolor=#d6d6d6
| 368078 ||  || — || May 20, 2005 || Mount Lemmon || Mount Lemmon Survey || 7:4 || align=right | 5.9 km || 
|-id=079 bgcolor=#d6d6d6
| 368079 ||  || — || April 10, 2005 || Kitt Peak || Spacewatch || 7:4 || align=right | 4.9 km || 
|-id=080 bgcolor=#E9E9E9
| 368080 ||  || — || October 4, 1996 || Kitt Peak || Spacewatch || — || align=right | 1.3 km || 
|-id=081 bgcolor=#d6d6d6
| 368081 ||  || — || October 26, 2008 || Kitt Peak || Spacewatch || — || align=right | 3.9 km || 
|-id=082 bgcolor=#d6d6d6
| 368082 ||  || — || August 19, 2006 || Kitt Peak || Spacewatch || VER || align=right | 3.2 km || 
|-id=083 bgcolor=#E9E9E9
| 368083 ||  || — || September 20, 2003 || Palomar || NEAT || — || align=right | 3.4 km || 
|-id=084 bgcolor=#E9E9E9
| 368084 ||  || — || January 8, 2010 || Mount Lemmon || Mount Lemmon Survey || — || align=right | 1.0 km || 
|-id=085 bgcolor=#E9E9E9
| 368085 ||  || — || March 25, 2010 || Mount Lemmon || Mount Lemmon Survey || — || align=right | 2.6 km || 
|-id=086 bgcolor=#C2FFFF
| 368086 ||  || — || October 26, 2001 || Kitt Peak || Spacewatch || L5ENM || align=right | 12 km || 
|-id=087 bgcolor=#E9E9E9
| 368087 ||  || — || December 18, 2004 || Mount Lemmon || Mount Lemmon Survey || — || align=right | 1.7 km || 
|-id=088 bgcolor=#fefefe
| 368088 ||  || — || April 6, 2011 || Kitt Peak || Spacewatch || NYS || align=right data-sort-value="0.69" | 690 m || 
|-id=089 bgcolor=#d6d6d6
| 368089 ||  || — || September 23, 2001 || Kitt Peak || Spacewatch || HYG || align=right | 2.6 km || 
|-id=090 bgcolor=#d6d6d6
| 368090 ||  || — || October 20, 2007 || Mount Lemmon || Mount Lemmon Survey || 628 || align=right | 1.8 km || 
|-id=091 bgcolor=#d6d6d6
| 368091 ||  || — || January 19, 2004 || Kitt Peak || Spacewatch || — || align=right | 3.3 km || 
|-id=092 bgcolor=#d6d6d6
| 368092 ||  || — || May 17, 2010 || WISE || WISE || — || align=right | 6.0 km || 
|-id=093 bgcolor=#d6d6d6
| 368093 ||  || — || November 8, 2007 || Kitt Peak || Spacewatch || — || align=right | 3.5 km || 
|-id=094 bgcolor=#fefefe
| 368094 ||  || — || March 3, 2006 || Catalina || CSS || V || align=right data-sort-value="0.92" | 920 m || 
|-id=095 bgcolor=#d6d6d6
| 368095 ||  || — || March 26, 2003 || Kitt Peak || Spacewatch || — || align=right | 2.4 km || 
|-id=096 bgcolor=#fefefe
| 368096 ||  || — || December 10, 2004 || Socorro || LINEAR || V || align=right | 1.1 km || 
|-id=097 bgcolor=#C2FFFF
| 368097 ||  || — || November 2, 2010 || Mount Lemmon || Mount Lemmon Survey || L4 || align=right | 10 km || 
|-id=098 bgcolor=#fefefe
| 368098 ||  || — || June 6, 2010 || ESA OGS || ESA OGS || V || align=right data-sort-value="0.76" | 760 m || 
|-id=099 bgcolor=#d6d6d6
| 368099 ||  || — || June 16, 2010 || WISE || WISE || HIL3:2 || align=right | 5.1 km || 
|-id=100 bgcolor=#d6d6d6
| 368100 ||  || — || May 2, 2010 || WISE || WISE || — || align=right | 3.4 km || 
|}

368101–368200 

|-bgcolor=#fefefe
| 368101 ||  || — || July 24, 2003 || Palomar || NEAT || H || align=right data-sort-value="0.69" | 690 m || 
|-id=102 bgcolor=#C2FFFF
| 368102 ||  || — || July 30, 2008 || Kitt Peak || Spacewatch || L4 || align=right | 8.5 km || 
|-id=103 bgcolor=#fefefe
| 368103 || 2013 EN || — || May 3, 2005 || Kitt Peak || DLS || H || align=right data-sort-value="0.61" | 610 m || 
|-id=104 bgcolor=#fefefe
| 368104 ||  || — || October 6, 1999 || Socorro || LINEAR || CIM || align=right | 3.7 km || 
|-id=105 bgcolor=#d6d6d6
| 368105 ||  || — || April 7, 2002 || Cerro Tololo || M. W. Buie || — || align=right | 5.8 km || 
|-id=106 bgcolor=#d6d6d6
| 368106 ||  || — || March 10, 2002 || Kitt Peak || Spacewatch || — || align=right | 2.5 km || 
|-id=107 bgcolor=#fefefe
| 368107 ||  || — || November 15, 1995 || Kitt Peak || Spacewatch || — || align=right data-sort-value="0.87" | 870 m || 
|-id=108 bgcolor=#fefefe
| 368108 ||  || — || September 26, 2000 || Haleakala || NEAT || V || align=right data-sort-value="0.92" | 920 m || 
|-id=109 bgcolor=#d6d6d6
| 368109 ||  || — || October 14, 2010 || Mount Lemmon || Mount Lemmon Survey || — || align=right | 3.8 km || 
|-id=110 bgcolor=#d6d6d6
| 368110 ||  || — || February 23, 2007 || Kitt Peak || Spacewatch || THM || align=right | 2.6 km || 
|-id=111 bgcolor=#E9E9E9
| 368111 ||  || — || February 3, 2008 || Catalina || CSS || — || align=right | 2.2 km || 
|-id=112 bgcolor=#d6d6d6
| 368112 ||  || — || March 16, 2007 || Catalina || CSS || EUP || align=right | 4.3 km || 
|-id=113 bgcolor=#E9E9E9
| 368113 ||  || — || October 22, 2006 || Catalina || CSS || AGN || align=right | 1.5 km || 
|-id=114 bgcolor=#d6d6d6
| 368114 ||  || — || September 20, 2003 || Kitt Peak || Spacewatch || — || align=right | 4.1 km || 
|-id=115 bgcolor=#fefefe
| 368115 ||  || — || December 11, 2004 || Bergisch Gladbach || W. Bickel || ERI || align=right | 1.8 km || 
|-id=116 bgcolor=#E9E9E9
| 368116 ||  || — || May 28, 2000 || Socorro || LINEAR || JUN || align=right | 1.5 km || 
|-id=117 bgcolor=#d6d6d6
| 368117 ||  || — || October 7, 2004 || Socorro || LINEAR || EOS || align=right | 3.2 km || 
|-id=118 bgcolor=#E9E9E9
| 368118 ||  || — || April 23, 2004 || Siding Spring || SSS || — || align=right | 2.5 km || 
|-id=119 bgcolor=#E9E9E9
| 368119 ||  || — || July 3, 2005 || Palomar || NEAT || — || align=right | 1.8 km || 
|-id=120 bgcolor=#d6d6d6
| 368120 ||  || — || December 6, 2005 || Kitt Peak || Spacewatch || — || align=right | 4.1 km || 
|-id=121 bgcolor=#fefefe
| 368121 ||  || — || February 27, 2009 || Catalina || CSS || — || align=right | 1.4 km || 
|-id=122 bgcolor=#fefefe
| 368122 ||  || — || October 4, 2007 || Catalina || CSS || — || align=right | 1.0 km || 
|-id=123 bgcolor=#d6d6d6
| 368123 ||  || — || October 25, 2005 || Kitt Peak || Spacewatch || — || align=right | 3.8 km || 
|-id=124 bgcolor=#E9E9E9
| 368124 ||  || — || April 12, 2004 || Catalina || CSS || EUN || align=right | 1.5 km || 
|-id=125 bgcolor=#fefefe
| 368125 ||  || — || August 16, 2006 || Siding Spring || SSS || — || align=right | 1.1 km || 
|-id=126 bgcolor=#fefefe
| 368126 ||  || — || August 21, 2006 || Kitt Peak || Spacewatch || MAS || align=right data-sort-value="0.66" | 660 m || 
|-id=127 bgcolor=#E9E9E9
| 368127 ||  || — || September 13, 2005 || Catalina || CSS || — || align=right | 1.7 km || 
|-id=128 bgcolor=#E9E9E9
| 368128 ||  || — || June 6, 2001 || Palomar || NEAT || — || align=right | 1.9 km || 
|-id=129 bgcolor=#d6d6d6
| 368129 ||  || — || October 21, 2003 || Socorro || LINEAR || LIX || align=right | 5.6 km || 
|-id=130 bgcolor=#E9E9E9
| 368130 ||  || — || September 28, 2000 || Socorro || LINEAR || — || align=right | 2.7 km || 
|-id=131 bgcolor=#E9E9E9
| 368131 ||  || — || March 17, 2004 || Catalina || CSS || ADE || align=right | 2.3 km || 
|-id=132 bgcolor=#E9E9E9
| 368132 ||  || — || September 18, 2010 || Mount Lemmon || Mount Lemmon Survey || BRG || align=right | 1.6 km || 
|-id=133 bgcolor=#E9E9E9
| 368133 ||  || — || November 18, 2006 || Kitt Peak || Spacewatch || — || align=right | 2.4 km || 
|-id=134 bgcolor=#fefefe
| 368134 ||  || — || January 18, 2009 || Kitt Peak || Spacewatch || — || align=right data-sort-value="0.97" | 970 m || 
|-id=135 bgcolor=#d6d6d6
| 368135 ||  || — || April 30, 2008 || Mount Lemmon || Mount Lemmon Survey || — || align=right | 3.9 km || 
|-id=136 bgcolor=#d6d6d6
| 368136 ||  || — || December 22, 2005 || Kitt Peak || Spacewatch || EOS || align=right | 2.2 km || 
|-id=137 bgcolor=#E9E9E9
| 368137 ||  || — || October 23, 2001 || Socorro || LINEAR || GEF || align=right | 1.9 km || 
|-id=138 bgcolor=#E9E9E9
| 368138 ||  || — || June 8, 2004 || Kitt Peak || Spacewatch || — || align=right | 2.5 km || 
|-id=139 bgcolor=#fefefe
| 368139 ||  || — || December 17, 2007 || Kitt Peak || Spacewatch || — || align=right data-sort-value="0.92" | 920 m || 
|-id=140 bgcolor=#fefefe
| 368140 ||  || — || December 25, 1995 || Kitt Peak || Spacewatch || H || align=right data-sort-value="0.67" | 670 m || 
|-id=141 bgcolor=#E9E9E9
| 368141 ||  || — || November 6, 2010 || Mount Lemmon || Mount Lemmon Survey || — || align=right | 1.5 km || 
|-id=142 bgcolor=#d6d6d6
| 368142 ||  || — || March 11, 2007 || Kitt Peak || Spacewatch || — || align=right | 3.5 km || 
|-id=143 bgcolor=#E9E9E9
| 368143 ||  || — || January 5, 2000 || Socorro || LINEAR || — || align=right | 1.9 km || 
|-id=144 bgcolor=#fefefe
| 368144 ||  || — || February 13, 2004 || Anderson Mesa || LONEOS || — || align=right | 2.4 km || 
|-id=145 bgcolor=#fefefe
| 368145 ||  || — || March 21, 1999 || Apache Point || SDSS || — || align=right | 1.0 km || 
|-id=146 bgcolor=#d6d6d6
| 368146 ||  || — || May 17, 2002 || Kitt Peak || Spacewatch || — || align=right | 3.5 km || 
|-id=147 bgcolor=#d6d6d6
| 368147 ||  || — || November 4, 2004 || Kitt Peak || Spacewatch || LIX || align=right | 4.7 km || 
|-id=148 bgcolor=#E9E9E9
| 368148 ||  || — || October 31, 2010 || Mount Lemmon || Mount Lemmon Survey || — || align=right | 3.2 km || 
|-id=149 bgcolor=#fefefe
| 368149 ||  || — || January 11, 2002 || Kitt Peak || Spacewatch || — || align=right data-sort-value="0.90" | 900 m || 
|-id=150 bgcolor=#FA8072
| 368150 || 1992 DC || — || February 26, 1992 || Palomar || C. S. Shoemaker || — || align=right | 1.0 km || 
|-id=151 bgcolor=#E9E9E9
| 368151 ||  || — || September 18, 1995 || Kitt Peak || Spacewatch || — || align=right | 2.0 km || 
|-id=152 bgcolor=#fefefe
| 368152 ||  || — || September 18, 1995 || Kitt Peak || Spacewatch || — || align=right data-sort-value="0.63" | 630 m || 
|-id=153 bgcolor=#FA8072
| 368153 ||  || — || October 22, 1995 || Modra || Modra Obs. || — || align=right | 1.4 km || 
|-id=154 bgcolor=#fefefe
| 368154 ||  || — || November 22, 1997 || Kitt Peak || Spacewatch || — || align=right data-sort-value="0.49" | 490 m || 
|-id=155 bgcolor=#fefefe
| 368155 ||  || — || January 25, 1998 || Kitt Peak || Spacewatch || — || align=right data-sort-value="0.66" | 660 m || 
|-id=156 bgcolor=#fefefe
| 368156 ||  || — || July 23, 1998 || Caussols || ODAS || — || align=right | 1.1 km || 
|-id=157 bgcolor=#FA8072
| 368157 ||  || — || September 14, 1998 || Socorro || LINEAR || — || align=right data-sort-value="0.68" | 680 m || 
|-id=158 bgcolor=#d6d6d6
| 368158 ||  || — || September 30, 1998 || Kitt Peak || Spacewatch || HIL3:2 || align=right | 5.9 km || 
|-id=159 bgcolor=#d6d6d6
| 368159 ||  || — || December 11, 1998 || Kitt Peak || Spacewatch || — || align=right | 3.4 km || 
|-id=160 bgcolor=#FA8072
| 368160 ||  || — || April 20, 1999 || Socorro || LINEAR || — || align=right | 2.3 km || 
|-id=161 bgcolor=#FA8072
| 368161 ||  || — || September 4, 1999 || Anderson Mesa || LONEOS || H || align=right data-sort-value="0.91" | 910 m || 
|-id=162 bgcolor=#E9E9E9
| 368162 ||  || — || September 7, 1999 || Socorro || LINEAR || — || align=right | 3.5 km || 
|-id=163 bgcolor=#FA8072
| 368163 ||  || — || September 9, 1999 || Socorro || LINEAR || — || align=right data-sort-value="0.73" | 730 m || 
|-id=164 bgcolor=#E9E9E9
| 368164 ||  || — || September 8, 1999 || Socorro || LINEAR || — || align=right | 2.6 km || 
|-id=165 bgcolor=#fefefe
| 368165 ||  || — || October 31, 1999 || Kitt Peak || Spacewatch || NYS || align=right data-sort-value="0.72" | 720 m || 
|-id=166 bgcolor=#fefefe
| 368166 ||  || — || October 17, 1999 || Kitt Peak || Spacewatch || — || align=right data-sort-value="0.79" | 790 m || 
|-id=167 bgcolor=#fefefe
| 368167 ||  || — || November 4, 1999 || Socorro || LINEAR || — || align=right data-sort-value="0.91" | 910 m || 
|-id=168 bgcolor=#fefefe
| 368168 ||  || — || November 9, 1999 || Socorro || LINEAR || — || align=right data-sort-value="0.71" | 710 m || 
|-id=169 bgcolor=#d6d6d6
| 368169 ||  || — || November 9, 1999 || Kitt Peak || Spacewatch || CHA || align=right | 2.1 km || 
|-id=170 bgcolor=#fefefe
| 368170 ||  || — || November 1, 1999 || Catalina || CSS || — || align=right data-sort-value="0.75" | 750 m || 
|-id=171 bgcolor=#fefefe
| 368171 ||  || — || December 4, 1999 || Catalina || CSS || — || align=right | 2.3 km || 
|-id=172 bgcolor=#fefefe
| 368172 ||  || — || December 7, 1999 || Kitt Peak || Spacewatch || MAS || align=right data-sort-value="0.58" | 580 m || 
|-id=173 bgcolor=#d6d6d6
| 368173 ||  || — || January 2, 2000 || Kitt Peak || Spacewatch || — || align=right | 2.8 km || 
|-id=174 bgcolor=#fefefe
| 368174 ||  || — || January 7, 2000 || Kitt Peak || Spacewatch || NYS || align=right data-sort-value="0.73" | 730 m || 
|-id=175 bgcolor=#d6d6d6
| 368175 ||  || — || January 28, 2000 || Kitt Peak || Spacewatch || — || align=right | 3.9 km || 
|-id=176 bgcolor=#fefefe
| 368176 ||  || — || January 28, 2000 || Kitt Peak || Spacewatch || NYS || align=right data-sort-value="0.73" | 730 m || 
|-id=177 bgcolor=#d6d6d6
| 368177 ||  || — || February 25, 2000 || Kitt Peak || Spacewatch || — || align=right | 3.9 km || 
|-id=178 bgcolor=#E9E9E9
| 368178 ||  || — || May 28, 2000 || Socorro || LINEAR || — || align=right | 1.2 km || 
|-id=179 bgcolor=#E9E9E9
| 368179 ||  || — || August 31, 2000 || Socorro || LINEAR || — || align=right | 3.1 km || 
|-id=180 bgcolor=#E9E9E9
| 368180 ||  || — || September 1, 2000 || Socorro || LINEAR || EUN || align=right | 1.2 km || 
|-id=181 bgcolor=#E9E9E9
| 368181 ||  || — || September 1, 2000 || Socorro || LINEAR || — || align=right | 1.7 km || 
|-id=182 bgcolor=#fefefe
| 368182 ||  || — || September 1, 2000 || Socorro || LINEAR || FLO || align=right data-sort-value="0.74" | 740 m || 
|-id=183 bgcolor=#E9E9E9
| 368183 ||  || — || September 2, 2000 || Socorro || LINEAR || — || align=right | 1.7 km || 
|-id=184 bgcolor=#FFC2E0
| 368184 ||  || — || September 8, 2000 || Socorro || LINEAR || ATEcritical || align=right data-sort-value="0.38" | 380 m || 
|-id=185 bgcolor=#E9E9E9
| 368185 ||  || — || September 5, 2000 || Anderson Mesa || LONEOS || — || align=right | 1.9 km || 
|-id=186 bgcolor=#E9E9E9
| 368186 ||  || — || September 23, 2000 || Socorro || LINEAR || ADE || align=right | 3.3 km || 
|-id=187 bgcolor=#E9E9E9
| 368187 ||  || — || September 23, 2000 || Socorro || LINEAR || AER || align=right | 1.7 km || 
|-id=188 bgcolor=#FA8072
| 368188 ||  || — || September 24, 2000 || Socorro || LINEAR || — || align=right data-sort-value="0.88" | 880 m || 
|-id=189 bgcolor=#fefefe
| 368189 ||  || — || September 5, 2000 || Anderson Mesa || LONEOS || — || align=right data-sort-value="0.79" | 790 m || 
|-id=190 bgcolor=#fefefe
| 368190 ||  || — || September 20, 2000 || Haleakala || NEAT || — || align=right data-sort-value="0.72" | 720 m || 
|-id=191 bgcolor=#fefefe
| 368191 ||  || — || September 23, 2000 || Anderson Mesa || LONEOS || FLO || align=right data-sort-value="0.74" | 740 m || 
|-id=192 bgcolor=#E9E9E9
| 368192 ||  || — || October 24, 2000 || Socorro || LINEAR || — || align=right | 2.0 km || 
|-id=193 bgcolor=#fefefe
| 368193 ||  || — || October 25, 2000 || Socorro || LINEAR || — || align=right data-sort-value="0.78" | 780 m || 
|-id=194 bgcolor=#FA8072
| 368194 ||  || — || November 19, 2000 || Socorro || LINEAR || — || align=right data-sort-value="0.88" | 880 m || 
|-id=195 bgcolor=#E9E9E9
| 368195 ||  || — || November 21, 2000 || Socorro || LINEAR || — || align=right | 3.1 km || 
|-id=196 bgcolor=#E9E9E9
| 368196 ||  || — || December 16, 2000 || Socorro || LINEAR || — || align=right | 2.6 km || 
|-id=197 bgcolor=#E9E9E9
| 368197 ||  || — || December 30, 2000 || Socorro || LINEAR || — || align=right | 4.2 km || 
|-id=198 bgcolor=#fefefe
| 368198 ||  || — || December 30, 2000 || Socorro || LINEAR || — || align=right | 1.2 km || 
|-id=199 bgcolor=#E9E9E9
| 368199 ||  || — || February 16, 2001 || Socorro || LINEAR || — || align=right | 3.7 km || 
|-id=200 bgcolor=#d6d6d6
| 368200 ||  || — || March 21, 2001 || Haleakala || NEAT || EUP || align=right | 4.2 km || 
|}

368201–368300 

|-bgcolor=#d6d6d6
| 368201 ||  || — || March 21, 2001 || Kitt Peak || Spacewatch || — || align=right | 3.4 km || 
|-id=202 bgcolor=#d6d6d6
| 368202 ||  || — || April 24, 2001 || Kitt Peak || Spacewatch || — || align=right | 3.7 km || 
|-id=203 bgcolor=#FFC2E0
| 368203 ||  || — || May 21, 2001 || Haleakala || NEAT || APOPHAcritical || align=right data-sort-value="0.30" | 300 m || 
|-id=204 bgcolor=#d6d6d6
| 368204 ||  || — || October 22, 2008 || Mount Lemmon || Mount Lemmon Survey || — || align=right | 3.4 km || 
|-id=205 bgcolor=#d6d6d6
| 368205 ||  || — || August 12, 2001 || Palomar || NEAT || — || align=right | 4.5 km || 
|-id=206 bgcolor=#E9E9E9
| 368206 ||  || — || August 23, 2001 || Socorro || LINEAR || — || align=right | 1.8 km || 
|-id=207 bgcolor=#E9E9E9
| 368207 ||  || — || August 25, 2001 || Socorro || LINEAR || — || align=right | 1.3 km || 
|-id=208 bgcolor=#E9E9E9
| 368208 ||  || — || August 19, 2001 || Socorro || LINEAR || — || align=right | 1.8 km || 
|-id=209 bgcolor=#E9E9E9
| 368209 ||  || — || September 8, 2001 || Socorro || LINEAR || — || align=right | 1.2 km || 
|-id=210 bgcolor=#E9E9E9
| 368210 ||  || — || September 10, 2001 || Socorro || LINEAR || — || align=right data-sort-value="0.78" | 780 m || 
|-id=211 bgcolor=#E9E9E9
| 368211 ||  || — || September 10, 2001 || Socorro || LINEAR || — || align=right | 1.1 km || 
|-id=212 bgcolor=#E9E9E9
| 368212 ||  || — || September 7, 2001 || Socorro || LINEAR || — || align=right | 1.2 km || 
|-id=213 bgcolor=#E9E9E9
| 368213 ||  || — || September 10, 2001 || Socorro || LINEAR || — || align=right | 1.2 km || 
|-id=214 bgcolor=#E9E9E9
| 368214 ||  || — || September 11, 2001 || Socorro || LINEAR || — || align=right data-sort-value="0.97" | 970 m || 
|-id=215 bgcolor=#E9E9E9
| 368215 ||  || — || September 20, 2001 || Socorro || LINEAR || — || align=right data-sort-value="0.90" | 900 m || 
|-id=216 bgcolor=#E9E9E9
| 368216 ||  || — || September 17, 2001 || Socorro || LINEAR || — || align=right data-sort-value="0.73" | 730 m || 
|-id=217 bgcolor=#E9E9E9
| 368217 ||  || — || September 16, 2001 || Socorro || LINEAR || — || align=right data-sort-value="0.84" | 840 m || 
|-id=218 bgcolor=#E9E9E9
| 368218 ||  || — || September 19, 2001 || Socorro || LINEAR || ADE || align=right | 2.1 km || 
|-id=219 bgcolor=#E9E9E9
| 368219 ||  || — || September 22, 2001 || Anderson Mesa || LONEOS || — || align=right | 1.4 km || 
|-id=220 bgcolor=#E9E9E9
| 368220 ||  || — || October 14, 2001 || Socorro || LINEAR || — || align=right data-sort-value="0.90" | 900 m || 
|-id=221 bgcolor=#E9E9E9
| 368221 ||  || — || October 13, 2001 || Socorro || LINEAR || — || align=right | 1.2 km || 
|-id=222 bgcolor=#E9E9E9
| 368222 ||  || — || October 14, 2001 || Socorro || LINEAR || — || align=right data-sort-value="0.97" | 970 m || 
|-id=223 bgcolor=#E9E9E9
| 368223 ||  || — || October 14, 2001 || Socorro || LINEAR || — || align=right | 1.1 km || 
|-id=224 bgcolor=#E9E9E9
| 368224 ||  || — || October 15, 2001 || Socorro || LINEAR || — || align=right | 1.5 km || 
|-id=225 bgcolor=#E9E9E9
| 368225 ||  || — || October 11, 2001 || Palomar || NEAT || — || align=right data-sort-value="0.81" | 810 m || 
|-id=226 bgcolor=#E9E9E9
| 368226 ||  || — || October 11, 2001 || Palomar || NEAT || — || align=right | 1.0 km || 
|-id=227 bgcolor=#E9E9E9
| 368227 ||  || — || October 15, 2001 || Socorro || LINEAR || — || align=right | 1.6 km || 
|-id=228 bgcolor=#E9E9E9
| 368228 ||  || — || October 11, 2001 || Socorro || LINEAR || — || align=right data-sort-value="0.89" | 890 m || 
|-id=229 bgcolor=#E9E9E9
| 368229 ||  || — || October 14, 2001 || Kitt Peak || Spacewatch || — || align=right | 1.0 km || 
|-id=230 bgcolor=#E9E9E9
| 368230 ||  || — || October 8, 2001 || Palomar || NEAT || — || align=right | 1.1 km || 
|-id=231 bgcolor=#FA8072
| 368231 ||  || — || October 21, 2001 || Socorro || LINEAR || — || align=right | 2.0 km || 
|-id=232 bgcolor=#E9E9E9
| 368232 ||  || — || October 17, 2001 || Socorro || LINEAR || RAF || align=right data-sort-value="0.83" | 830 m || 
|-id=233 bgcolor=#E9E9E9
| 368233 ||  || — || October 17, 2001 || Socorro || LINEAR || — || align=right | 1.7 km || 
|-id=234 bgcolor=#E9E9E9
| 368234 ||  || — || October 17, 2001 || Socorro || LINEAR || — || align=right data-sort-value="0.69" | 690 m || 
|-id=235 bgcolor=#E9E9E9
| 368235 ||  || — || September 20, 2001 || Socorro || LINEAR || HNS || align=right | 1.3 km || 
|-id=236 bgcolor=#E9E9E9
| 368236 ||  || — || October 17, 2001 || Socorro || LINEAR || — || align=right data-sort-value="0.86" | 860 m || 
|-id=237 bgcolor=#E9E9E9
| 368237 ||  || — || October 22, 2001 || Socorro || LINEAR || — || align=right | 1.1 km || 
|-id=238 bgcolor=#E9E9E9
| 368238 ||  || — || October 21, 2001 || Socorro || LINEAR || critical || align=right data-sort-value="0.82" | 820 m || 
|-id=239 bgcolor=#E9E9E9
| 368239 ||  || — || October 21, 2001 || Socorro || LINEAR || — || align=right | 2.0 km || 
|-id=240 bgcolor=#E9E9E9
| 368240 ||  || — || October 23, 2001 || Socorro || LINEAR || MAR || align=right | 1.3 km || 
|-id=241 bgcolor=#E9E9E9
| 368241 ||  || — || October 24, 2001 || Socorro || LINEAR || ADE || align=right | 2.4 km || 
|-id=242 bgcolor=#E9E9E9
| 368242 ||  || — || November 10, 2001 || Socorro || LINEAR || — || align=right | 2.1 km || 
|-id=243 bgcolor=#E9E9E9
| 368243 ||  || — || November 10, 2001 || Socorro || LINEAR || — || align=right | 2.3 km || 
|-id=244 bgcolor=#E9E9E9
| 368244 ||  || — || November 12, 2001 || Socorro || LINEAR || — || align=right | 2.4 km || 
|-id=245 bgcolor=#E9E9E9
| 368245 ||  || — || November 12, 2001 || Socorro || LINEAR || — || align=right | 1.0 km || 
|-id=246 bgcolor=#E9E9E9
| 368246 ||  || — || November 19, 2001 || Socorro || LINEAR || — || align=right data-sort-value="0.98" | 980 m || 
|-id=247 bgcolor=#E9E9E9
| 368247 ||  || — || November 20, 2001 || Socorro || LINEAR || — || align=right | 1.1 km || 
|-id=248 bgcolor=#E9E9E9
| 368248 ||  || — || November 16, 2001 || Kitt Peak || Spacewatch || — || align=right data-sort-value="0.97" | 970 m || 
|-id=249 bgcolor=#E9E9E9
| 368249 ||  || — || November 17, 2001 || Socorro || LINEAR || — || align=right | 1.1 km || 
|-id=250 bgcolor=#E9E9E9
| 368250 ||  || — || December 9, 2001 || Socorro || LINEAR || BAR || align=right | 2.2 km || 
|-id=251 bgcolor=#E9E9E9
| 368251 ||  || — || December 10, 2001 || Socorro || LINEAR || — || align=right | 3.8 km || 
|-id=252 bgcolor=#E9E9E9
| 368252 ||  || — || December 11, 2001 || Socorro || LINEAR || — || align=right | 1.7 km || 
|-id=253 bgcolor=#E9E9E9
| 368253 ||  || — || October 18, 2001 || Socorro || LINEAR || HNS || align=right | 1.8 km || 
|-id=254 bgcolor=#FA8072
| 368254 ||  || — || December 14, 2001 || Socorro || LINEAR || — || align=right | 3.0 km || 
|-id=255 bgcolor=#E9E9E9
| 368255 ||  || — || December 14, 2001 || Socorro || LINEAR || — || align=right | 1.3 km || 
|-id=256 bgcolor=#E9E9E9
| 368256 ||  || — || December 14, 2001 || Socorro || LINEAR || — || align=right data-sort-value="0.99" | 990 m || 
|-id=257 bgcolor=#E9E9E9
| 368257 ||  || — || December 14, 2001 || Socorro || LINEAR || — || align=right | 2.4 km || 
|-id=258 bgcolor=#E9E9E9
| 368258 ||  || — || December 15, 2001 || Socorro || LINEAR || — || align=right | 1.5 km || 
|-id=259 bgcolor=#E9E9E9
| 368259 ||  || — || December 15, 2001 || Socorro || LINEAR || — || align=right | 1.6 km || 
|-id=260 bgcolor=#E9E9E9
| 368260 ||  || — || December 13, 2001 || Palomar || NEAT || — || align=right | 1.5 km || 
|-id=261 bgcolor=#E9E9E9
| 368261 ||  || — || December 18, 2001 || Socorro || LINEAR || — || align=right | 1.5 km || 
|-id=262 bgcolor=#E9E9E9
| 368262 ||  || — || December 18, 2001 || Socorro || LINEAR || JUN || align=right | 1.5 km || 
|-id=263 bgcolor=#E9E9E9
| 368263 ||  || — || December 22, 2001 || Socorro || LINEAR || — || align=right | 2.8 km || 
|-id=264 bgcolor=#E9E9E9
| 368264 ||  || — || January 13, 2002 || Socorro || LINEAR || — || align=right | 1.6 km || 
|-id=265 bgcolor=#E9E9E9
| 368265 ||  || — || December 23, 2001 || Palomar || NEAT || HNS || align=right | 1.6 km || 
|-id=266 bgcolor=#fefefe
| 368266 ||  || — || February 8, 2002 || Socorro || LINEAR || H || align=right data-sort-value="0.79" | 790 m || 
|-id=267 bgcolor=#fefefe
| 368267 ||  || — || February 12, 2002 || Socorro || LINEAR || H || align=right data-sort-value="0.77" | 770 m || 
|-id=268 bgcolor=#E9E9E9
| 368268 ||  || — || January 7, 2002 || Kitt Peak || Spacewatch || — || align=right | 2.3 km || 
|-id=269 bgcolor=#E9E9E9
| 368269 ||  || — || January 9, 2002 || Socorro || LINEAR || HNS || align=right | 1.6 km || 
|-id=270 bgcolor=#E9E9E9
| 368270 ||  || — || January 12, 2002 || Kitt Peak || Spacewatch || — || align=right | 2.0 km || 
|-id=271 bgcolor=#E9E9E9
| 368271 ||  || — || February 10, 2002 || Socorro || LINEAR || — || align=right | 1.7 km || 
|-id=272 bgcolor=#E9E9E9
| 368272 ||  || — || February 10, 2002 || Socorro || LINEAR || — || align=right | 3.8 km || 
|-id=273 bgcolor=#E9E9E9
| 368273 ||  || — || January 13, 2002 || Socorro || LINEAR || — || align=right | 2.5 km || 
|-id=274 bgcolor=#E9E9E9
| 368274 ||  || — || February 15, 2002 || Socorro || LINEAR || — || align=right | 2.6 km || 
|-id=275 bgcolor=#E9E9E9
| 368275 ||  || — || March 5, 2002 || Eskridge || Farpoint Obs. || — || align=right | 2.0 km || 
|-id=276 bgcolor=#fefefe
| 368276 ||  || — || April 9, 2002 || Socorro || LINEAR || — || align=right | 2.7 km || 
|-id=277 bgcolor=#fefefe
| 368277 ||  || — || May 6, 2002 || Socorro || LINEAR || PHO || align=right | 1.3 km || 
|-id=278 bgcolor=#fefefe
| 368278 ||  || — || May 5, 2002 || Socorro || LINEAR || PHO || align=right | 1.5 km || 
|-id=279 bgcolor=#fefefe
| 368279 ||  || — || May 9, 2002 || Palomar || NEAT || V || align=right data-sort-value="0.76" | 760 m || 
|-id=280 bgcolor=#fefefe
| 368280 ||  || — || June 14, 2002 || Palomar || NEAT || — || align=right | 1.1 km || 
|-id=281 bgcolor=#d6d6d6
| 368281 ||  || — || June 17, 2002 || Palomar || NEAT || — || align=right | 3.2 km || 
|-id=282 bgcolor=#FA8072
| 368282 ||  || — || July 10, 2002 || Palomar || NEAT || — || align=right data-sort-value="0.98" | 980 m || 
|-id=283 bgcolor=#fefefe
| 368283 ||  || — || July 12, 2002 || Palomar || NEAT || — || align=right | 1.0 km || 
|-id=284 bgcolor=#FA8072
| 368284 ||  || — || July 9, 2002 || Socorro || LINEAR || — || align=right | 1.1 km || 
|-id=285 bgcolor=#fefefe
| 368285 ||  || — || July 8, 2002 || Palomar || NEAT || NYS || align=right data-sort-value="0.70" | 700 m || 
|-id=286 bgcolor=#fefefe
| 368286 ||  || — || July 13, 2002 || Socorro || LINEAR || H || align=right data-sort-value="0.87" | 870 m || 
|-id=287 bgcolor=#fefefe
| 368287 ||  || — || July 13, 2002 || Haleakala || NEAT || NYS || align=right data-sort-value="0.65" | 650 m || 
|-id=288 bgcolor=#d6d6d6
| 368288 ||  || — || July 8, 2002 || Palomar || NEAT || — || align=right | 3.1 km || 
|-id=289 bgcolor=#d6d6d6
| 368289 ||  || — || July 14, 2002 || Palomar || NEAT || — || align=right | 3.1 km || 
|-id=290 bgcolor=#d6d6d6
| 368290 ||  || — || October 31, 2008 || Mount Lemmon || Mount Lemmon Survey || — || align=right | 2.5 km || 
|-id=291 bgcolor=#d6d6d6
| 368291 ||  || — || October 29, 2008 || Mount Lemmon || Mount Lemmon Survey || — || align=right | 3.1 km || 
|-id=292 bgcolor=#d6d6d6
| 368292 ||  || — || September 5, 2008 || Socorro || LINEAR || — || align=right | 4.0 km || 
|-id=293 bgcolor=#fefefe
| 368293 ||  || — || July 22, 2002 || Palomar || NEAT || — || align=right | 1.6 km || 
|-id=294 bgcolor=#fefefe
| 368294 ||  || — || July 23, 2002 || Palomar || NEAT || — || align=right data-sort-value="0.99" | 990 m || 
|-id=295 bgcolor=#d6d6d6
| 368295 ||  || — || July 19, 2002 || Palomar || NEAT || — || align=right | 2.8 km || 
|-id=296 bgcolor=#d6d6d6
| 368296 ||  || — || July 22, 2002 || Palomar || NEAT || EOS || align=right | 5.3 km || 
|-id=297 bgcolor=#d6d6d6
| 368297 ||  || — || July 20, 2002 || Palomar || NEAT || — || align=right | 4.0 km || 
|-id=298 bgcolor=#fefefe
| 368298 ||  || — || July 22, 2002 || Palomar || NEAT || V || align=right data-sort-value="0.76" | 760 m || 
|-id=299 bgcolor=#d6d6d6
| 368299 ||  || — || October 5, 2002 || Apache Point || SDSS || — || align=right | 3.3 km || 
|-id=300 bgcolor=#d6d6d6
| 368300 ||  || — || March 10, 2005 || Apache Point || SDSS || — || align=right | 2.5 km || 
|}

368301–368400 

|-bgcolor=#d6d6d6
| 368301 ||  || — || September 29, 2008 || La Sagra || OAM Obs. || — || align=right | 2.7 km || 
|-id=302 bgcolor=#d6d6d6
| 368302 ||  || — || October 22, 2003 || Kitt Peak || Spacewatch || — || align=right | 3.4 km || 
|-id=303 bgcolor=#d6d6d6
| 368303 ||  || — || September 22, 2008 || Kitt Peak || Spacewatch || — || align=right | 2.0 km || 
|-id=304 bgcolor=#d6d6d6
| 368304 ||  || — || September 28, 2003 || Kitt Peak || Spacewatch || — || align=right | 3.2 km || 
|-id=305 bgcolor=#d6d6d6
| 368305 ||  || — || August 3, 2002 || Palomar || NEAT || — || align=right | 3.7 km || 
|-id=306 bgcolor=#d6d6d6
| 368306 ||  || — || August 2, 2002 || Campo Imperatore || CINEOS || — || align=right | 5.1 km || 
|-id=307 bgcolor=#d6d6d6
| 368307 ||  || — || August 6, 2002 || Palomar || NEAT || — || align=right | 2.9 km || 
|-id=308 bgcolor=#d6d6d6
| 368308 ||  || — || August 6, 2002 || Palomar || NEAT || EUP || align=right | 4.4 km || 
|-id=309 bgcolor=#fefefe
| 368309 ||  || — || August 5, 2002 || Palomar || NEAT || — || align=right data-sort-value="0.91" | 910 m || 
|-id=310 bgcolor=#fefefe
| 368310 ||  || — || August 6, 2002 || Palomar || NEAT || — || align=right data-sort-value="0.98" | 980 m || 
|-id=311 bgcolor=#d6d6d6
| 368311 ||  || — || August 4, 2002 || Palomar || NEAT || TIR || align=right | 3.9 km || 
|-id=312 bgcolor=#d6d6d6
| 368312 ||  || — || August 11, 2002 || Palomar || NEAT || LIX || align=right | 3.5 km || 
|-id=313 bgcolor=#fefefe
| 368313 ||  || — || August 12, 2002 || Socorro || LINEAR || — || align=right data-sort-value="0.72" | 720 m || 
|-id=314 bgcolor=#d6d6d6
| 368314 ||  || — || August 12, 2002 || Socorro || LINEAR || — || align=right | 3.3 km || 
|-id=315 bgcolor=#d6d6d6
| 368315 ||  || — || August 12, 2002 || Socorro || LINEAR || — || align=right | 3.8 km || 
|-id=316 bgcolor=#d6d6d6
| 368316 ||  || — || August 13, 2002 || Anderson Mesa || LONEOS || — || align=right | 3.7 km || 
|-id=317 bgcolor=#d6d6d6
| 368317 ||  || — || August 13, 2002 || Anderson Mesa || LONEOS || — || align=right | 4.2 km || 
|-id=318 bgcolor=#d6d6d6
| 368318 ||  || — || August 14, 2002 || Palomar || NEAT || TIR || align=right | 3.7 km || 
|-id=319 bgcolor=#d6d6d6
| 368319 ||  || — || August 15, 2002 || Socorro || LINEAR || TIR || align=right | 3.8 km || 
|-id=320 bgcolor=#fefefe
| 368320 ||  || — || August 14, 2002 || Bergisch Gladbac || W. Bickel || MAS || align=right data-sort-value="0.72" | 720 m || 
|-id=321 bgcolor=#fefefe
| 368321 ||  || — || August 8, 2002 || Palomar || S. F. Hönig || — || align=right data-sort-value="0.71" | 710 m || 
|-id=322 bgcolor=#d6d6d6
| 368322 ||  || — || August 7, 2002 || Palomar || NEAT || TIR || align=right | 2.9 km || 
|-id=323 bgcolor=#d6d6d6
| 368323 ||  || — || August 7, 2002 || Palomar || NEAT || — || align=right | 3.7 km || 
|-id=324 bgcolor=#d6d6d6
| 368324 ||  || — || August 15, 2002 || Palomar || NEAT || — || align=right | 2.8 km || 
|-id=325 bgcolor=#d6d6d6
| 368325 ||  || — || August 11, 2002 || Palomar || NEAT || — || align=right | 3.5 km || 
|-id=326 bgcolor=#d6d6d6
| 368326 ||  || — || August 11, 2002 || Palomar || NEAT || LIX || align=right | 3.0 km || 
|-id=327 bgcolor=#d6d6d6
| 368327 ||  || — || August 7, 2002 || Palomar || NEAT || — || align=right | 2.7 km || 
|-id=328 bgcolor=#d6d6d6
| 368328 ||  || — || January 15, 2004 || Palomar || NEAT || — || align=right | 4.8 km || 
|-id=329 bgcolor=#d6d6d6
| 368329 ||  || — || September 29, 2008 || Mount Lemmon || Mount Lemmon Survey || — || align=right | 5.2 km || 
|-id=330 bgcolor=#d6d6d6
| 368330 ||  || — || April 25, 2007 || Mount Lemmon || Mount Lemmon Survey || — || align=right | 2.8 km || 
|-id=331 bgcolor=#d6d6d6
| 368331 ||  || — || October 23, 2003 || Kitt Peak || Spacewatch || VER || align=right | 3.1 km || 
|-id=332 bgcolor=#d6d6d6
| 368332 ||  || — || October 6, 2008 || Catalina || CSS || EOS || align=right | 2.3 km || 
|-id=333 bgcolor=#d6d6d6
| 368333 ||  || — || April 26, 2006 || Cerro Tololo || M. W. Buie || — || align=right | 2.8 km || 
|-id=334 bgcolor=#d6d6d6
| 368334 ||  || — || August 16, 2002 || Haleakala || NEAT || — || align=right | 5.1 km || 
|-id=335 bgcolor=#d6d6d6
| 368335 ||  || — || August 16, 2002 || Palomar || NEAT || — || align=right | 2.9 km || 
|-id=336 bgcolor=#fefefe
| 368336 ||  || — || August 16, 2002 || Haleakala || NEAT || NYS || align=right data-sort-value="0.58" | 580 m || 
|-id=337 bgcolor=#fefefe
| 368337 ||  || — || August 13, 2002 || Palomar || NEAT || — || align=right data-sort-value="0.86" | 860 m || 
|-id=338 bgcolor=#d6d6d6
| 368338 ||  || — || August 12, 2002 || Socorro || LINEAR || — || align=right | 2.8 km || 
|-id=339 bgcolor=#d6d6d6
| 368339 ||  || — || August 26, 2002 || Palomar || NEAT || — || align=right | 4.3 km || 
|-id=340 bgcolor=#d6d6d6
| 368340 ||  || — || August 30, 2002 || Kitt Peak || Spacewatch || — || align=right | 3.2 km || 
|-id=341 bgcolor=#fefefe
| 368341 ||  || — || August 16, 2002 || Palomar || NEAT || — || align=right data-sort-value="0.90" | 900 m || 
|-id=342 bgcolor=#d6d6d6
| 368342 ||  || — || August 18, 2002 || Palomar || NEAT || — || align=right | 3.0 km || 
|-id=343 bgcolor=#fefefe
| 368343 ||  || — || August 18, 2002 || Palomar || NEAT || ERI || align=right | 1.3 km || 
|-id=344 bgcolor=#d6d6d6
| 368344 ||  || — || August 26, 2002 || Palomar || NEAT || — || align=right | 2.9 km || 
|-id=345 bgcolor=#d6d6d6
| 368345 ||  || — || August 19, 2002 || Palomar || NEAT || — || align=right | 3.0 km || 
|-id=346 bgcolor=#d6d6d6
| 368346 ||  || — || August 27, 2002 || Palomar || NEAT || TIR || align=right | 2.7 km || 
|-id=347 bgcolor=#d6d6d6
| 368347 ||  || — || August 18, 2002 || Palomar || NEAT || — || align=right | 2.7 km || 
|-id=348 bgcolor=#fefefe
| 368348 ||  || — || August 26, 2002 || Palomar || NEAT || — || align=right | 1.0 km || 
|-id=349 bgcolor=#d6d6d6
| 368349 ||  || — || August 26, 2002 || Palomar || NEAT || — || align=right | 3.9 km || 
|-id=350 bgcolor=#d6d6d6
| 368350 ||  || — || August 17, 2002 || Palomar || NEAT || — || align=right | 2.9 km || 
|-id=351 bgcolor=#d6d6d6
| 368351 ||  || — || August 27, 2002 || Palomar || NEAT || EOS || align=right | 2.7 km || 
|-id=352 bgcolor=#d6d6d6
| 368352 ||  || — || August 16, 2002 || Palomar || NEAT || URS || align=right | 3.6 km || 
|-id=353 bgcolor=#d6d6d6
| 368353 ||  || — || July 22, 2002 || Palomar || NEAT || — || align=right | 2.8 km || 
|-id=354 bgcolor=#fefefe
| 368354 ||  || — || August 29, 2002 || Palomar || NEAT || NYS || align=right data-sort-value="0.67" | 670 m || 
|-id=355 bgcolor=#d6d6d6
| 368355 ||  || — || August 16, 2002 || Palomar || NEAT || — || align=right | 6.1 km || 
|-id=356 bgcolor=#d6d6d6
| 368356 ||  || — || August 28, 2002 || Palomar || NEAT || — || align=right | 2.8 km || 
|-id=357 bgcolor=#d6d6d6
| 368357 ||  || — || August 16, 2002 || Palomar || NEAT || — || align=right | 2.3 km || 
|-id=358 bgcolor=#fefefe
| 368358 ||  || — || August 16, 2002 || Palomar || NEAT || — || align=right data-sort-value="0.71" | 710 m || 
|-id=359 bgcolor=#d6d6d6
| 368359 ||  || — || August 18, 2002 || Palomar || NEAT || THM || align=right | 2.1 km || 
|-id=360 bgcolor=#fefefe
| 368360 ||  || — || August 17, 2002 || Palomar || NEAT || NYS || align=right data-sort-value="0.63" | 630 m || 
|-id=361 bgcolor=#d6d6d6
| 368361 ||  || — || August 12, 2002 || Socorro || LINEAR || — || align=right | 4.4 km || 
|-id=362 bgcolor=#fefefe
| 368362 ||  || — || August 16, 2002 || Palomar || NEAT || — || align=right data-sort-value="0.98" | 980 m || 
|-id=363 bgcolor=#d6d6d6
| 368363 ||  || — || January 16, 2005 || Kitt Peak || Spacewatch || — || align=right | 3.9 km || 
|-id=364 bgcolor=#d6d6d6
| 368364 ||  || — || March 19, 2010 || WISE || WISE || — || align=right | 3.1 km || 
|-id=365 bgcolor=#fefefe
| 368365 ||  || — || September 14, 2006 || Kitt Peak || Spacewatch || MAS || align=right data-sort-value="0.86" | 860 m || 
|-id=366 bgcolor=#d6d6d6
| 368366 ||  || — || September 20, 2008 || Mount Lemmon || Mount Lemmon Survey || EOS || align=right | 2.0 km || 
|-id=367 bgcolor=#d6d6d6
| 368367 ||  || — || September 19, 2008 || Kitt Peak || Spacewatch || EOS || align=right | 1.9 km || 
|-id=368 bgcolor=#d6d6d6
| 368368 ||  || — || May 14, 2001 || Kitt Peak || Spacewatch || — || align=right | 3.9 km || 
|-id=369 bgcolor=#fefefe
| 368369 ||  || — || September 17, 2006 || Kitt Peak || Spacewatch || — || align=right data-sort-value="0.64" | 640 m || 
|-id=370 bgcolor=#fefefe
| 368370 ||  || — || September 1, 2002 || Haleakala || NEAT || MAS || align=right data-sort-value="0.83" | 830 m || 
|-id=371 bgcolor=#fefefe
| 368371 ||  || — || September 4, 2002 || Palomar || NEAT || — || align=right data-sort-value="0.95" | 950 m || 
|-id=372 bgcolor=#fefefe
| 368372 ||  || — || September 4, 2002 || Anderson Mesa || LONEOS || — || align=right data-sort-value="0.82" | 820 m || 
|-id=373 bgcolor=#fefefe
| 368373 ||  || — || September 4, 2002 || Anderson Mesa || LONEOS || MAS || align=right data-sort-value="0.82" | 820 m || 
|-id=374 bgcolor=#fefefe
| 368374 ||  || — || September 4, 2002 || Anderson Mesa || LONEOS || NYS || align=right data-sort-value="0.79" | 790 m || 
|-id=375 bgcolor=#fefefe
| 368375 ||  || — || September 4, 2002 || Palomar || NEAT || — || align=right data-sort-value="0.86" | 860 m || 
|-id=376 bgcolor=#d6d6d6
| 368376 ||  || — || September 5, 2002 || Socorro || LINEAR || — || align=right | 3.2 km || 
|-id=377 bgcolor=#d6d6d6
| 368377 ||  || — || September 5, 2002 || Socorro || LINEAR || LIX || align=right | 3.6 km || 
|-id=378 bgcolor=#d6d6d6
| 368378 ||  || — || September 5, 2002 || Socorro || LINEAR || EOS || align=right | 3.1 km || 
|-id=379 bgcolor=#d6d6d6
| 368379 ||  || — || September 5, 2002 || Socorro || LINEAR || — || align=right | 4.5 km || 
|-id=380 bgcolor=#d6d6d6
| 368380 ||  || — || September 10, 2002 || Palomar || NEAT || — || align=right | 3.8 km || 
|-id=381 bgcolor=#fefefe
| 368381 ||  || — || September 12, 2002 || Palomar || NEAT || — || align=right data-sort-value="0.88" | 880 m || 
|-id=382 bgcolor=#d6d6d6
| 368382 ||  || — || September 11, 2002 || Palomar || NEAT || — || align=right | 3.3 km || 
|-id=383 bgcolor=#fefefe
| 368383 ||  || — || September 14, 2002 || Palomar || NEAT || — || align=right data-sort-value="0.96" | 960 m || 
|-id=384 bgcolor=#d6d6d6
| 368384 ||  || — || September 13, 2002 || Anderson Mesa || LONEOS || Tj (2.93) || align=right | 4.2 km || 
|-id=385 bgcolor=#fefefe
| 368385 ||  || — || September 15, 2002 || Palomar || NEAT || — || align=right data-sort-value="0.89" | 890 m || 
|-id=386 bgcolor=#d6d6d6
| 368386 ||  || — || August 16, 2002 || Palomar || R. Matson || EOS || align=right | 1.8 km || 
|-id=387 bgcolor=#fefefe
| 368387 ||  || — || September 5, 2002 || Haleakala || NEAT || MAS || align=right data-sort-value="0.57" | 570 m || 
|-id=388 bgcolor=#d6d6d6
| 368388 ||  || — || September 1, 2002 || Palomar || NEAT || HYG || align=right | 3.6 km || 
|-id=389 bgcolor=#fefefe
| 368389 ||  || — || September 4, 2002 || Palomar || NEAT || V || align=right data-sort-value="0.61" | 610 m || 
|-id=390 bgcolor=#d6d6d6
| 368390 ||  || — || September 14, 2002 || Palomar || Palomar Obs. || HYG || align=right | 2.8 km || 
|-id=391 bgcolor=#d6d6d6
| 368391 ||  || — || September 14, 2002 || Palomar || NEAT || — || align=right | 2.5 km || 
|-id=392 bgcolor=#d6d6d6
| 368392 ||  || — || September 27, 2002 || Palomar || NEAT || EOS || align=right | 2.8 km || 
|-id=393 bgcolor=#fefefe
| 368393 ||  || — || September 27, 2002 || Palomar || NEAT || NYS || align=right data-sort-value="0.78" | 780 m || 
|-id=394 bgcolor=#fefefe
| 368394 ||  || — || September 27, 2002 || Palomar || NEAT || NYS || align=right data-sort-value="0.76" | 760 m || 
|-id=395 bgcolor=#d6d6d6
| 368395 ||  || — || September 26, 2002 || Palomar || NEAT || THM || align=right | 2.7 km || 
|-id=396 bgcolor=#fefefe
| 368396 ||  || — || September 26, 2002 || Palomar || NEAT || — || align=right data-sort-value="0.95" | 950 m || 
|-id=397 bgcolor=#fefefe
| 368397 ||  || — || September 30, 2002 || Socorro || LINEAR || V || align=right data-sort-value="0.96" | 960 m || 
|-id=398 bgcolor=#fefefe
| 368398 ||  || — || September 27, 2002 || Palomar || NEAT || NYS || align=right data-sort-value="0.62" | 620 m || 
|-id=399 bgcolor=#fefefe
| 368399 ||  || — || October 2, 2002 || Socorro || LINEAR || — || align=right | 1.1 km || 
|-id=400 bgcolor=#fefefe
| 368400 ||  || — || October 2, 2002 || Socorro || LINEAR || MAS || align=right data-sort-value="0.85" | 850 m || 
|}

368401–368500 

|-bgcolor=#d6d6d6
| 368401 ||  || — || October 2, 2002 || Socorro || LINEAR || — || align=right | 5.0 km || 
|-id=402 bgcolor=#d6d6d6
| 368402 ||  || — || August 22, 2002 || Palomar || NEAT || — || align=right | 3.4 km || 
|-id=403 bgcolor=#fefefe
| 368403 ||  || — || October 1, 2002 || Anderson Mesa || LONEOS || — || align=right data-sort-value="0.94" | 940 m || 
|-id=404 bgcolor=#d6d6d6
| 368404 ||  || — || October 2, 2002 || Haleakala || NEAT || — || align=right | 4.0 km || 
|-id=405 bgcolor=#d6d6d6
| 368405 ||  || — || October 4, 2002 || Palomar || NEAT || LIX || align=right | 4.1 km || 
|-id=406 bgcolor=#d6d6d6
| 368406 ||  || — || October 2, 2002 || Socorro || LINEAR || THM || align=right | 2.2 km || 
|-id=407 bgcolor=#d6d6d6
| 368407 ||  || — || October 5, 2002 || Palomar || NEAT || — || align=right | 4.7 km || 
|-id=408 bgcolor=#d6d6d6
| 368408 ||  || — || October 5, 2002 || Palomar || NEAT || EOS || align=right | 2.8 km || 
|-id=409 bgcolor=#d6d6d6
| 368409 ||  || — || October 5, 2002 || Palomar || NEAT || — || align=right | 3.7 km || 
|-id=410 bgcolor=#d6d6d6
| 368410 ||  || — || October 3, 2002 || Palomar || NEAT || — || align=right | 3.9 km || 
|-id=411 bgcolor=#d6d6d6
| 368411 ||  || — || October 3, 2002 || Palomar || NEAT || URS || align=right | 6.3 km || 
|-id=412 bgcolor=#d6d6d6
| 368412 ||  || — || October 3, 2002 || Palomar || NEAT || — || align=right | 4.4 km || 
|-id=413 bgcolor=#fefefe
| 368413 ||  || — || October 5, 2002 || Socorro || LINEAR || — || align=right | 1.1 km || 
|-id=414 bgcolor=#fefefe
| 368414 ||  || — || October 8, 2002 || Anderson Mesa || LONEOS || — || align=right data-sort-value="0.88" | 880 m || 
|-id=415 bgcolor=#fefefe
| 368415 ||  || — || October 6, 2002 || Socorro || LINEAR || — || align=right | 1.3 km || 
|-id=416 bgcolor=#d6d6d6
| 368416 ||  || — || October 6, 2002 || Socorro || LINEAR || — || align=right | 4.5 km || 
|-id=417 bgcolor=#fefefe
| 368417 ||  || — || October 10, 2002 || Palomar || NEAT || MAS || align=right data-sort-value="0.70" | 700 m || 
|-id=418 bgcolor=#d6d6d6
| 368418 ||  || — || October 10, 2002 || Socorro || LINEAR || — || align=right | 4.1 km || 
|-id=419 bgcolor=#d6d6d6
| 368419 ||  || — || October 9, 2002 || Socorro || LINEAR || — || align=right | 3.6 km || 
|-id=420 bgcolor=#fefefe
| 368420 ||  || — || October 10, 2002 || Socorro || LINEAR || — || align=right | 1.4 km || 
|-id=421 bgcolor=#d6d6d6
| 368421 ||  || — || July 17, 2001 || Haleakala || NEAT || — || align=right | 4.2 km || 
|-id=422 bgcolor=#d6d6d6
| 368422 ||  || — || October 5, 2002 || Apache Point || SDSS || THM || align=right | 2.7 km || 
|-id=423 bgcolor=#fefefe
| 368423 ||  || — || October 10, 2002 || Apache Point || SDSS || — || align=right data-sort-value="0.65" | 650 m || 
|-id=424 bgcolor=#fefefe
| 368424 ||  || — || October 10, 2002 || Apache Point || SDSS || NYS || align=right data-sort-value="0.73" | 730 m || 
|-id=425 bgcolor=#fefefe
| 368425 ||  || — || October 28, 2002 || Socorro || LINEAR || PHO || align=right | 1.7 km || 
|-id=426 bgcolor=#d6d6d6
| 368426 ||  || — || October 28, 2002 || Palomar || NEAT || — || align=right | 4.2 km || 
|-id=427 bgcolor=#d6d6d6
| 368427 ||  || — || October 28, 2002 || Socorro || LINEAR || EUP || align=right | 4.1 km || 
|-id=428 bgcolor=#d6d6d6
| 368428 ||  || — || October 30, 2002 || Socorro || LINEAR || — || align=right | 5.1 km || 
|-id=429 bgcolor=#d6d6d6
| 368429 ||  || — || October 30, 2002 || Palomar || NEAT || — || align=right | 4.4 km || 
|-id=430 bgcolor=#fefefe
| 368430 ||  || — || October 29, 2002 || Apache Point || SDSS || V || align=right data-sort-value="0.65" | 650 m || 
|-id=431 bgcolor=#fefefe
| 368431 ||  || — || November 2, 2002 || La Palma || La Palma Obs. || NYS || align=right data-sort-value="0.63" | 630 m || 
|-id=432 bgcolor=#fefefe
| 368432 ||  || — || October 16, 2002 || Palomar || NEAT || V || align=right data-sort-value="0.86" | 860 m || 
|-id=433 bgcolor=#fefefe
| 368433 ||  || — || November 4, 2002 || Haleakala || NEAT || — || align=right data-sort-value="0.86" | 860 m || 
|-id=434 bgcolor=#fefefe
| 368434 ||  || — || November 5, 2002 || Palomar || NEAT || — || align=right data-sort-value="0.85" | 850 m || 
|-id=435 bgcolor=#fefefe
| 368435 ||  || — || November 3, 2002 || Haleakala || NEAT || — || align=right data-sort-value="0.69" | 690 m || 
|-id=436 bgcolor=#fefefe
| 368436 ||  || — || November 7, 2002 || Socorro || LINEAR || NYS || align=right data-sort-value="0.76" | 760 m || 
|-id=437 bgcolor=#fefefe
| 368437 ||  || — || November 13, 2002 || Socorro || LINEAR || — || align=right data-sort-value="0.84" | 840 m || 
|-id=438 bgcolor=#fefefe
| 368438 ||  || — || February 28, 2008 || Kitt Peak || Spacewatch || — || align=right | 1.4 km || 
|-id=439 bgcolor=#fefefe
| 368439 ||  || — || November 28, 2002 || Anderson Mesa || LONEOS || CIM || align=right | 2.1 km || 
|-id=440 bgcolor=#fefefe
| 368440 ||  || — || November 23, 2002 || Palomar || NEAT || — || align=right data-sort-value="0.98" | 980 m || 
|-id=441 bgcolor=#fefefe
| 368441 ||  || — || November 6, 2002 || Socorro || LINEAR || — || align=right data-sort-value="0.95" | 950 m || 
|-id=442 bgcolor=#d6d6d6
| 368442 ||  || — || December 3, 2002 || Palomar || NEAT || — || align=right | 4.8 km || 
|-id=443 bgcolor=#E9E9E9
| 368443 ||  || — || December 11, 2002 || Socorro || LINEAR || — || align=right | 1.8 km || 
|-id=444 bgcolor=#fefefe
| 368444 ||  || — || November 5, 2002 || Socorro || LINEAR || — || align=right | 1.3 km || 
|-id=445 bgcolor=#E9E9E9
| 368445 ||  || — || January 26, 2003 || Anderson Mesa || LONEOS || ADE || align=right | 3.2 km || 
|-id=446 bgcolor=#E9E9E9
| 368446 ||  || — || March 6, 2003 || Socorro || LINEAR || — || align=right | 2.1 km || 
|-id=447 bgcolor=#E9E9E9
| 368447 ||  || — || March 8, 2003 || Anderson Mesa || LONEOS || GER || align=right | 1.6 km || 
|-id=448 bgcolor=#E9E9E9
| 368448 ||  || — || March 23, 2003 || Kitt Peak || Spacewatch || — || align=right | 1.7 km || 
|-id=449 bgcolor=#E9E9E9
| 368449 ||  || — || March 24, 2003 || Kitt Peak || Spacewatch || — || align=right | 1.6 km || 
|-id=450 bgcolor=#E9E9E9
| 368450 ||  || — || March 26, 2003 || Palomar || NEAT || — || align=right | 1.7 km || 
|-id=451 bgcolor=#E9E9E9
| 368451 ||  || — || April 8, 2003 || Kitt Peak || Spacewatch || — || align=right | 1.9 km || 
|-id=452 bgcolor=#E9E9E9
| 368452 ||  || — || May 8, 2003 || Haleakala || NEAT || — || align=right | 2.2 km || 
|-id=453 bgcolor=#d6d6d6
| 368453 ||  || — || July 25, 2003 || Socorro || LINEAR || — || align=right | 4.0 km || 
|-id=454 bgcolor=#fefefe
| 368454 ||  || — || August 21, 2003 || Palomar || NEAT || FLO || align=right data-sort-value="0.72" | 720 m || 
|-id=455 bgcolor=#FA8072
| 368455 ||  || — || August 23, 2003 || Socorro || LINEAR || — || align=right data-sort-value="0.98" | 980 m || 
|-id=456 bgcolor=#fefefe
| 368456 ||  || — || August 21, 2003 || Campo Imperatore || CINEOS || FLO || align=right data-sort-value="0.58" | 580 m || 
|-id=457 bgcolor=#E9E9E9
| 368457 ||  || — || September 18, 2003 || Palomar || NEAT || — || align=right | 2.1 km || 
|-id=458 bgcolor=#d6d6d6
| 368458 ||  || — || September 19, 2003 || Kitt Peak || Spacewatch || — || align=right | 3.6 km || 
|-id=459 bgcolor=#fefefe
| 368459 ||  || — || September 19, 2003 || Kitt Peak || Spacewatch || FLO || align=right data-sort-value="0.65" | 650 m || 
|-id=460 bgcolor=#d6d6d6
| 368460 ||  || — || September 18, 2003 || Palomar || NEAT || NAE || align=right | 4.1 km || 
|-id=461 bgcolor=#fefefe
| 368461 ||  || — || September 18, 2003 || Kitt Peak || Spacewatch || — || align=right data-sort-value="0.72" | 720 m || 
|-id=462 bgcolor=#d6d6d6
| 368462 ||  || — || September 20, 2003 || Palomar || NEAT || — || align=right | 3.8 km || 
|-id=463 bgcolor=#d6d6d6
| 368463 ||  || — || September 20, 2003 || Socorro || LINEAR || — || align=right | 3.4 km || 
|-id=464 bgcolor=#d6d6d6
| 368464 ||  || — || September 20, 2003 || Socorro || LINEAR || — || align=right | 2.5 km || 
|-id=465 bgcolor=#d6d6d6
| 368465 ||  || — || September 19, 2003 || Kitt Peak || Spacewatch || URS || align=right | 3.0 km || 
|-id=466 bgcolor=#d6d6d6
| 368466 ||  || — || September 19, 2003 || Campo Imperatore || CINEOS || — || align=right | 3.7 km || 
|-id=467 bgcolor=#d6d6d6
| 368467 ||  || — || September 20, 2003 || Palomar || NEAT || — || align=right | 4.6 km || 
|-id=468 bgcolor=#fefefe
| 368468 ||  || — || August 28, 2003 || Socorro || LINEAR || FLO || align=right data-sort-value="0.72" | 720 m || 
|-id=469 bgcolor=#d6d6d6
| 368469 ||  || — || September 19, 2003 || Palomar || NEAT || — || align=right | 3.5 km || 
|-id=470 bgcolor=#fefefe
| 368470 ||  || — || September 19, 2003 || Kitt Peak || Spacewatch || FLO || align=right data-sort-value="0.70" | 700 m || 
|-id=471 bgcolor=#fefefe
| 368471 ||  || — || September 17, 2003 || Kitt Peak || Spacewatch || — || align=right data-sort-value="0.83" | 830 m || 
|-id=472 bgcolor=#d6d6d6
| 368472 ||  || — || September 19, 2003 || Kitt Peak || Spacewatch || EOS || align=right | 2.5 km || 
|-id=473 bgcolor=#fefefe
| 368473 ||  || — || September 20, 2003 || Palomar || NEAT || — || align=right data-sort-value="0.95" | 950 m || 
|-id=474 bgcolor=#fefefe
| 368474 ||  || — || September 21, 2003 || Anderson Mesa || LONEOS || — || align=right data-sort-value="0.90" | 900 m || 
|-id=475 bgcolor=#FA8072
| 368475 ||  || — || September 30, 2003 || Socorro || LINEAR || — || align=right | 1.4 km || 
|-id=476 bgcolor=#d6d6d6
| 368476 ||  || — || September 26, 2003 || Socorro || LINEAR || EOS || align=right | 3.0 km || 
|-id=477 bgcolor=#FA8072
| 368477 ||  || — || September 27, 2003 || Socorro || LINEAR || — || align=right | 1.2 km || 
|-id=478 bgcolor=#fefefe
| 368478 ||  || — || September 27, 2003 || Kitt Peak || Spacewatch || FLO || align=right data-sort-value="0.83" | 830 m || 
|-id=479 bgcolor=#d6d6d6
| 368479 ||  || — || September 20, 2003 || Socorro || LINEAR || — || align=right | 3.2 km || 
|-id=480 bgcolor=#d6d6d6
| 368480 ||  || — || September 20, 2003 || Palomar || NEAT || EOS || align=right | 2.8 km || 
|-id=481 bgcolor=#FA8072
| 368481 ||  || — || September 29, 2003 || Socorro || LINEAR || — || align=right | 1.2 km || 
|-id=482 bgcolor=#fefefe
| 368482 ||  || — || September 25, 2003 || Haleakala || NEAT || — || align=right | 1.1 km || 
|-id=483 bgcolor=#fefefe
| 368483 ||  || — || September 22, 2003 || Palomar || NEAT || — || align=right data-sort-value="0.87" | 870 m || 
|-id=484 bgcolor=#d6d6d6
| 368484 ||  || — || September 16, 2003 || Palomar || NEAT || — || align=right | 4.1 km || 
|-id=485 bgcolor=#fefefe
| 368485 ||  || — || September 17, 2003 || Palomar || NEAT || — || align=right data-sort-value="0.99" | 990 m || 
|-id=486 bgcolor=#fefefe
| 368486 ||  || — || September 20, 2003 || Socorro || LINEAR || — || align=right data-sort-value="0.91" | 910 m || 
|-id=487 bgcolor=#d6d6d6
| 368487 ||  || — || September 19, 2003 || Socorro || LINEAR || — || align=right | 2.7 km || 
|-id=488 bgcolor=#fefefe
| 368488 ||  || — || September 26, 2003 || Apache Point || SDSS || — || align=right data-sort-value="0.63" | 630 m || 
|-id=489 bgcolor=#fefefe
| 368489 || 2003 TF || — || October 1, 2003 || Desert Eagle || W. K. Y. Yeung || — || align=right | 1.0 km || 
|-id=490 bgcolor=#fefefe
| 368490 ||  || — || October 1, 2003 || Kitt Peak || Spacewatch || FLO || align=right data-sort-value="0.83" | 830 m || 
|-id=491 bgcolor=#d6d6d6
| 368491 ||  || — || October 1, 2003 || Kitt Peak || Spacewatch || — || align=right | 3.2 km || 
|-id=492 bgcolor=#d6d6d6
| 368492 ||  || — || October 3, 2003 || Kitt Peak || Spacewatch || EOS || align=right | 2.1 km || 
|-id=493 bgcolor=#d6d6d6
| 368493 ||  || — || October 16, 2003 || Palomar || NEAT || EOS || align=right | 3.2 km || 
|-id=494 bgcolor=#fefefe
| 368494 ||  || — || October 22, 2003 || Socorro || LINEAR || H || align=right data-sort-value="0.68" | 680 m || 
|-id=495 bgcolor=#d6d6d6
| 368495 ||  || — || October 15, 2003 || Anderson Mesa || LONEOS || — || align=right | 3.3 km || 
|-id=496 bgcolor=#d6d6d6
| 368496 ||  || — || October 17, 2003 || Anderson Mesa || LONEOS || JLI || align=right | 4.5 km || 
|-id=497 bgcolor=#d6d6d6
| 368497 ||  || — || October 17, 2003 || Anderson Mesa || LONEOS || — || align=right | 3.9 km || 
|-id=498 bgcolor=#fefefe
| 368498 ||  || — || October 17, 2003 || Kitt Peak || Spacewatch || FLO || align=right data-sort-value="0.70" | 700 m || 
|-id=499 bgcolor=#d6d6d6
| 368499 ||  || — || October 17, 2003 || Anderson Mesa || LONEOS || — || align=right | 3.6 km || 
|-id=500 bgcolor=#d6d6d6
| 368500 ||  || — || October 20, 2003 || Palomar || NEAT || — || align=right | 3.3 km || 
|}

368501–368600 

|-bgcolor=#fefefe
| 368501 ||  || — || October 18, 2003 || Kitt Peak || Spacewatch || NYS || align=right data-sort-value="0.61" | 610 m || 
|-id=502 bgcolor=#fefefe
| 368502 ||  || — || October 18, 2003 || Kitt Peak || Spacewatch || V || align=right data-sort-value="0.58" | 580 m || 
|-id=503 bgcolor=#d6d6d6
| 368503 ||  || — || October 21, 2003 || Kitt Peak || Spacewatch || — || align=right | 4.7 km || 
|-id=504 bgcolor=#d6d6d6
| 368504 ||  || — || October 16, 2003 || Anderson Mesa || LONEOS || — || align=right | 2.8 km || 
|-id=505 bgcolor=#d6d6d6
| 368505 ||  || — || October 18, 2003 || Anderson Mesa || LONEOS || — || align=right | 4.6 km || 
|-id=506 bgcolor=#E9E9E9
| 368506 ||  || — || October 18, 2003 || Palomar || NEAT || — || align=right data-sort-value="0.98" | 980 m || 
|-id=507 bgcolor=#d6d6d6
| 368507 ||  || — || October 20, 2003 || Socorro || LINEAR || — || align=right | 3.0 km || 
|-id=508 bgcolor=#d6d6d6
| 368508 ||  || — || October 23, 2003 || Haleakala || NEAT || — || align=right | 3.1 km || 
|-id=509 bgcolor=#fefefe
| 368509 ||  || — || October 21, 2003 || Socorro || LINEAR || NYS || align=right data-sort-value="0.79" | 790 m || 
|-id=510 bgcolor=#fefefe
| 368510 ||  || — || October 23, 2003 || Kitt Peak || Spacewatch || V || align=right data-sort-value="0.90" | 900 m || 
|-id=511 bgcolor=#d6d6d6
| 368511 ||  || — || October 22, 2003 || Kitt Peak || Spacewatch || — || align=right | 2.9 km || 
|-id=512 bgcolor=#fefefe
| 368512 ||  || — || September 27, 2003 || Kitt Peak || Spacewatch || — || align=right data-sort-value="0.70" | 700 m || 
|-id=513 bgcolor=#d6d6d6
| 368513 ||  || — || September 29, 2003 || Kitt Peak || Spacewatch || — || align=right | 3.5 km || 
|-id=514 bgcolor=#fefefe
| 368514 ||  || — || October 19, 2003 || Kitt Peak || Spacewatch || FLO || align=right data-sort-value="0.62" | 620 m || 
|-id=515 bgcolor=#d6d6d6
| 368515 ||  || — || October 24, 2003 || Kitt Peak || Spacewatch || — || align=right | 2.2 km || 
|-id=516 bgcolor=#d6d6d6
| 368516 ||  || — || October 25, 2003 || Socorro || LINEAR || — || align=right | 2.9 km || 
|-id=517 bgcolor=#fefefe
| 368517 ||  || — || October 2, 2003 || Kitt Peak || Spacewatch || — || align=right data-sort-value="0.67" | 670 m || 
|-id=518 bgcolor=#fefefe
| 368518 ||  || — || October 19, 2003 || Kitt Peak || Spacewatch || NYS || align=right data-sort-value="0.58" | 580 m || 
|-id=519 bgcolor=#d6d6d6
| 368519 ||  || — || September 22, 2003 || Kitt Peak || Spacewatch || — || align=right | 3.3 km || 
|-id=520 bgcolor=#fefefe
| 368520 ||  || — || October 22, 2003 || Apache Point || SDSS || — || align=right data-sort-value="0.61" | 610 m || 
|-id=521 bgcolor=#d6d6d6
| 368521 ||  || — || November 16, 2003 || Kitt Peak || Spacewatch || — || align=right | 3.4 km || 
|-id=522 bgcolor=#fefefe
| 368522 ||  || — || November 19, 2003 || Socorro || LINEAR || FLO || align=right data-sort-value="0.61" | 610 m || 
|-id=523 bgcolor=#d6d6d6
| 368523 ||  || — || November 19, 2003 || Socorro || LINEAR || — || align=right | 4.7 km || 
|-id=524 bgcolor=#d6d6d6
| 368524 ||  || — || November 19, 2003 || Socorro || LINEAR || — || align=right | 3.5 km || 
|-id=525 bgcolor=#d6d6d6
| 368525 ||  || — || October 24, 2003 || Kitt Peak || Spacewatch || — || align=right | 2.9 km || 
|-id=526 bgcolor=#fefefe
| 368526 ||  || — || November 18, 2003 || Kitt Peak || Spacewatch || FLO || align=right data-sort-value="0.64" | 640 m || 
|-id=527 bgcolor=#d6d6d6
| 368527 ||  || — || November 19, 2003 || Palomar || NEAT || — || align=right | 4.3 km || 
|-id=528 bgcolor=#fefefe
| 368528 ||  || — || October 21, 2003 || Kitt Peak || Spacewatch || — || align=right data-sort-value="0.80" | 800 m || 
|-id=529 bgcolor=#fefefe
| 368529 ||  || — || November 20, 2003 || Socorro || LINEAR || — || align=right data-sort-value="0.98" | 980 m || 
|-id=530 bgcolor=#d6d6d6
| 368530 ||  || — || November 20, 2003 || Kitt Peak || Spacewatch || — || align=right | 2.5 km || 
|-id=531 bgcolor=#FA8072
| 368531 ||  || — || November 19, 2003 || Palomar || NEAT || — || align=right data-sort-value="0.82" | 820 m || 
|-id=532 bgcolor=#fefefe
| 368532 ||  || — || November 18, 2003 || Kitt Peak || Spacewatch || FLO || align=right data-sort-value="0.72" | 720 m || 
|-id=533 bgcolor=#d6d6d6
| 368533 ||  || — || November 18, 2003 || Palomar || NEAT || — || align=right | 3.7 km || 
|-id=534 bgcolor=#d6d6d6
| 368534 ||  || — || November 21, 2003 || Socorro || LINEAR || HYG || align=right | 3.1 km || 
|-id=535 bgcolor=#d6d6d6
| 368535 ||  || — || November 20, 2003 || Socorro || LINEAR || — || align=right | 4.1 km || 
|-id=536 bgcolor=#fefefe
| 368536 ||  || — || November 20, 2003 || Socorro || LINEAR || FLO || align=right data-sort-value="0.76" | 760 m || 
|-id=537 bgcolor=#d6d6d6
| 368537 ||  || — || November 20, 2003 || Socorro || LINEAR || — || align=right | 2.9 km || 
|-id=538 bgcolor=#d6d6d6
| 368538 ||  || — || November 21, 2003 || Palomar || NEAT || URS || align=right | 4.4 km || 
|-id=539 bgcolor=#d6d6d6
| 368539 ||  || — || November 24, 2003 || Socorro || LINEAR || — || align=right | 5.7 km || 
|-id=540 bgcolor=#d6d6d6
| 368540 ||  || — || November 29, 2003 || Socorro || LINEAR || — || align=right | 3.5 km || 
|-id=541 bgcolor=#d6d6d6
| 368541 ||  || — || November 29, 2003 || Kitt Peak || Spacewatch || — || align=right | 3.4 km || 
|-id=542 bgcolor=#d6d6d6
| 368542 ||  || — || November 30, 2003 || Kitt Peak || Spacewatch || EOS || align=right | 2.2 km || 
|-id=543 bgcolor=#d6d6d6
| 368543 ||  || — || November 19, 2003 || Catalina || CSS || — || align=right | 2.5 km || 
|-id=544 bgcolor=#fefefe
| 368544 ||  || — || November 19, 2003 || Socorro || LINEAR || — || align=right data-sort-value="0.81" | 810 m || 
|-id=545 bgcolor=#fefefe
| 368545 ||  || — || December 3, 2003 || Socorro || LINEAR || H || align=right | 1.0 km || 
|-id=546 bgcolor=#fefefe
| 368546 ||  || — || December 16, 2003 || Kitt Peak || Spacewatch || — || align=right data-sort-value="0.93" | 930 m || 
|-id=547 bgcolor=#d6d6d6
| 368547 ||  || — || December 19, 2003 || Socorro || LINEAR || — || align=right | 4.1 km || 
|-id=548 bgcolor=#d6d6d6
| 368548 ||  || — || December 18, 2003 || Socorro || LINEAR || — || align=right | 3.9 km || 
|-id=549 bgcolor=#fefefe
| 368549 ||  || — || December 18, 2003 || Socorro || LINEAR || — || align=right data-sort-value="0.86" | 860 m || 
|-id=550 bgcolor=#d6d6d6
| 368550 ||  || — || December 19, 2003 || Socorro || LINEAR || — || align=right | 3.6 km || 
|-id=551 bgcolor=#fefefe
| 368551 ||  || — || December 27, 2003 || Socorro || LINEAR || — || align=right data-sort-value="0.81" | 810 m || 
|-id=552 bgcolor=#d6d6d6
| 368552 ||  || — || December 28, 2003 || Socorro || LINEAR || — || align=right | 3.8 km || 
|-id=553 bgcolor=#d6d6d6
| 368553 ||  || — || December 28, 2003 || Socorro || LINEAR || — || align=right | 3.6 km || 
|-id=554 bgcolor=#d6d6d6
| 368554 ||  || — || December 28, 2003 || Socorro || LINEAR || — || align=right | 5.1 km || 
|-id=555 bgcolor=#d6d6d6
| 368555 ||  || — || December 29, 2003 || Catalina || CSS || — || align=right | 5.2 km || 
|-id=556 bgcolor=#fefefe
| 368556 ||  || — || December 17, 2003 || Kitt Peak || Spacewatch || NYS || align=right data-sort-value="0.77" | 770 m || 
|-id=557 bgcolor=#d6d6d6
| 368557 ||  || — || January 18, 2004 || Kitt Peak || Spacewatch || EOS || align=right | 2.7 km || 
|-id=558 bgcolor=#fefefe
| 368558 ||  || — || January 16, 2004 || Palomar || NEAT || H || align=right data-sort-value="0.77" | 770 m || 
|-id=559 bgcolor=#d6d6d6
| 368559 ||  || — || January 19, 2004 || Kitt Peak || Spacewatch || — || align=right | 3.5 km || 
|-id=560 bgcolor=#fefefe
| 368560 ||  || — || January 23, 2004 || Socorro || LINEAR || — || align=right data-sort-value="0.99" | 990 m || 
|-id=561 bgcolor=#fefefe
| 368561 ||  || — || January 28, 2004 || Socorro || LINEAR || H || align=right data-sort-value="0.78" | 780 m || 
|-id=562 bgcolor=#fefefe
| 368562 ||  || — || January 29, 2004 || Socorro || LINEAR || H || align=right data-sort-value="0.74" | 740 m || 
|-id=563 bgcolor=#fefefe
| 368563 ||  || — || February 11, 2004 || Palomar || NEAT || H || align=right data-sort-value="0.85" | 850 m || 
|-id=564 bgcolor=#fefefe
| 368564 ||  || — || February 12, 2004 || Kitt Peak || Spacewatch || MAS || align=right data-sort-value="0.79" | 790 m || 
|-id=565 bgcolor=#FFC2E0
| 368565 ||  || — || March 22, 2004 || Socorro || LINEAR || APOPHA || align=right data-sort-value="0.37" | 370 m || 
|-id=566 bgcolor=#E9E9E9
| 368566 ||  || — || April 12, 2004 || Kitt Peak || Spacewatch || — || align=right data-sort-value="0.79" | 790 m || 
|-id=567 bgcolor=#fefefe
| 368567 ||  || — || April 12, 2004 || Kitt Peak || Spacewatch || — || align=right | 1.1 km || 
|-id=568 bgcolor=#E9E9E9
| 368568 ||  || — || April 12, 2004 || Kitt Peak || Spacewatch || — || align=right data-sort-value="0.98" | 980 m || 
|-id=569 bgcolor=#fefefe
| 368569 ||  || — || May 9, 2004 || Kitt Peak || Spacewatch || H || align=right data-sort-value="0.90" | 900 m || 
|-id=570 bgcolor=#E9E9E9
| 368570 ||  || — || May 15, 2004 || Socorro || LINEAR || — || align=right | 2.3 km || 
|-id=571 bgcolor=#E9E9E9
| 368571 ||  || — || May 16, 2004 || Socorro || LINEAR || — || align=right | 2.0 km || 
|-id=572 bgcolor=#E9E9E9
| 368572 ||  || — || June 12, 2004 || Socorro || LINEAR || — || align=right | 1.9 km || 
|-id=573 bgcolor=#E9E9E9
| 368573 ||  || — || July 15, 2004 || Socorro || LINEAR || JUN || align=right | 1.5 km || 
|-id=574 bgcolor=#E9E9E9
| 368574 ||  || — || August 7, 2004 || Palomar || NEAT || — || align=right | 3.6 km || 
|-id=575 bgcolor=#E9E9E9
| 368575 ||  || — || August 3, 2004 || Siding Spring || SSS || — || align=right | 2.6 km || 
|-id=576 bgcolor=#E9E9E9
| 368576 ||  || — || August 8, 2004 || Anderson Mesa || LONEOS || JUN || align=right | 1.4 km || 
|-id=577 bgcolor=#E9E9E9
| 368577 ||  || — || August 7, 2004 || Palomar || NEAT || CLO || align=right | 2.3 km || 
|-id=578 bgcolor=#E9E9E9
| 368578 ||  || — || August 9, 2004 || Campo Imperatore || CINEOS || — || align=right | 3.4 km || 
|-id=579 bgcolor=#E9E9E9
| 368579 ||  || — || August 6, 2004 || Palomar || NEAT || — || align=right | 2.0 km || 
|-id=580 bgcolor=#E9E9E9
| 368580 ||  || — || August 7, 2004 || Palomar || NEAT || — || align=right | 3.1 km || 
|-id=581 bgcolor=#E9E9E9
| 368581 ||  || — || August 12, 2004 || Palomar || NEAT || — || align=right | 2.2 km || 
|-id=582 bgcolor=#E9E9E9
| 368582 ||  || — || August 15, 2004 || Kleť || Kleť Obs. || — || align=right | 3.4 km || 
|-id=583 bgcolor=#E9E9E9
| 368583 ||  || — || August 21, 2004 || Goodricke-Pigott || R. A. Tucker || EUN || align=right | 1.3 km || 
|-id=584 bgcolor=#E9E9E9
| 368584 ||  || — || August 16, 2004 || Siding Spring || SSS || — || align=right | 1.8 km || 
|-id=585 bgcolor=#E9E9E9
| 368585 ||  || — || August 20, 2004 || Kitt Peak || Spacewatch || — || align=right | 2.9 km || 
|-id=586 bgcolor=#E9E9E9
| 368586 ||  || — || September 7, 2004 || Kitt Peak || Spacewatch || AEO || align=right | 1.3 km || 
|-id=587 bgcolor=#E9E9E9
| 368587 ||  || — || September 7, 2004 || Kitt Peak || Spacewatch || GEF || align=right | 1.6 km || 
|-id=588 bgcolor=#E9E9E9
| 368588 Lazrek ||  ||  || September 8, 2004 || Vicques || M. Ory || — || align=right | 3.5 km || 
|-id=589 bgcolor=#E9E9E9
| 368589 ||  || — || September 7, 2004 || Socorro || LINEAR || — || align=right | 3.2 km || 
|-id=590 bgcolor=#E9E9E9
| 368590 ||  || — || September 8, 2004 || Socorro || LINEAR || — || align=right | 3.6 km || 
|-id=591 bgcolor=#E9E9E9
| 368591 ||  || — || September 8, 2004 || Socorro || LINEAR || GEF || align=right | 1.7 km || 
|-id=592 bgcolor=#E9E9E9
| 368592 ||  || — || September 8, 2004 || Socorro || LINEAR || — || align=right | 2.8 km || 
|-id=593 bgcolor=#E9E9E9
| 368593 ||  || — || September 8, 2004 || Socorro || LINEAR || — || align=right | 1.8 km || 
|-id=594 bgcolor=#E9E9E9
| 368594 ||  || — || September 8, 2004 || Socorro || LINEAR || — || align=right | 2.7 km || 
|-id=595 bgcolor=#E9E9E9
| 368595 ||  || — || September 8, 2004 || Socorro || LINEAR || CLO || align=right | 2.3 km || 
|-id=596 bgcolor=#E9E9E9
| 368596 ||  || — || September 8, 2004 || Socorro || LINEAR || — || align=right | 2.7 km || 
|-id=597 bgcolor=#E9E9E9
| 368597 ||  || — || September 8, 2004 || Palomar || NEAT || — || align=right | 2.8 km || 
|-id=598 bgcolor=#E9E9E9
| 368598 ||  || — || September 8, 2004 || Palomar || NEAT || — || align=right | 3.0 km || 
|-id=599 bgcolor=#FA8072
| 368599 ||  || — || September 10, 2004 || Socorro || LINEAR || — || align=right | 3.2 km || 
|-id=600 bgcolor=#E9E9E9
| 368600 ||  || — || September 10, 2004 || Socorro || LINEAR || DOR || align=right | 2.7 km || 
|}

368601–368700 

|-bgcolor=#E9E9E9
| 368601 ||  || — || September 10, 2004 || Socorro || LINEAR || — || align=right | 3.0 km || 
|-id=602 bgcolor=#E9E9E9
| 368602 ||  || — || September 10, 2004 || Socorro || LINEAR || — || align=right | 2.7 km || 
|-id=603 bgcolor=#E9E9E9
| 368603 ||  || — || September 11, 2004 || Socorro || LINEAR || — || align=right | 2.4 km || 
|-id=604 bgcolor=#E9E9E9
| 368604 ||  || — || September 11, 2004 || Socorro || LINEAR || — || align=right | 3.0 km || 
|-id=605 bgcolor=#E9E9E9
| 368605 ||  || — || September 11, 2004 || Socorro || LINEAR || — || align=right | 3.7 km || 
|-id=606 bgcolor=#E9E9E9
| 368606 ||  || — || September 11, 2004 || Socorro || LINEAR || — || align=right | 2.1 km || 
|-id=607 bgcolor=#E9E9E9
| 368607 ||  || — || September 11, 2004 || Socorro || LINEAR || — || align=right | 3.1 km || 
|-id=608 bgcolor=#E9E9E9
| 368608 ||  || — || September 11, 2004 || Socorro || LINEAR || — || align=right | 3.9 km || 
|-id=609 bgcolor=#E9E9E9
| 368609 ||  || — || September 6, 2004 || Socorro || LINEAR || GAL || align=right | 2.0 km || 
|-id=610 bgcolor=#E9E9E9
| 368610 ||  || — || September 10, 2004 || Kitt Peak || Spacewatch || NEM || align=right | 2.4 km || 
|-id=611 bgcolor=#E9E9E9
| 368611 ||  || — || September 15, 2004 || Socorro || LINEAR || — || align=right | 4.5 km || 
|-id=612 bgcolor=#E9E9E9
| 368612 ||  || — || September 10, 2004 || Socorro || LINEAR || GEF || align=right | 1.2 km || 
|-id=613 bgcolor=#E9E9E9
| 368613 ||  || — || September 13, 2004 || Kitt Peak || Spacewatch || DOR || align=right | 2.9 km || 
|-id=614 bgcolor=#E9E9E9
| 368614 ||  || — || September 13, 2004 || Socorro || LINEAR || — || align=right | 2.9 km || 
|-id=615 bgcolor=#E9E9E9
| 368615 ||  || — || September 17, 2004 || Kitt Peak || Spacewatch || — || align=right | 2.2 km || 
|-id=616 bgcolor=#E9E9E9
| 368616 ||  || — || September 19, 2004 || CBA-NOVAC || D. R. Skillman || — || align=right | 2.3 km || 
|-id=617 bgcolor=#E9E9E9
| 368617 Sebastianotero ||  ||  || October 5, 2004 || Sonoita || W. R. Cooney Jr., J. Gross || — || align=right | 2.7 km || 
|-id=618 bgcolor=#E9E9E9
| 368618 ||  || — || October 14, 2004 || Goodricke-Pigott || R. A. Tucker || — || align=right | 2.7 km || 
|-id=619 bgcolor=#E9E9E9
| 368619 ||  || — || October 4, 2004 || Kitt Peak || Spacewatch || — || align=right | 2.7 km || 
|-id=620 bgcolor=#E9E9E9
| 368620 ||  || — || October 5, 2004 || Kitt Peak || Spacewatch || AGN || align=right | 1.2 km || 
|-id=621 bgcolor=#E9E9E9
| 368621 ||  || — || October 5, 2004 || Palomar || NEAT || — || align=right | 2.5 km || 
|-id=622 bgcolor=#d6d6d6
| 368622 ||  || — || October 7, 2004 || Kitt Peak || Spacewatch || K-2 || align=right | 1.3 km || 
|-id=623 bgcolor=#E9E9E9
| 368623 ||  || — || October 7, 2004 || Kitt Peak || Spacewatch || WIT || align=right | 1.3 km || 
|-id=624 bgcolor=#E9E9E9
| 368624 ||  || — || October 8, 2004 || Kitt Peak || Spacewatch || HOF || align=right | 3.1 km || 
|-id=625 bgcolor=#E9E9E9
| 368625 ||  || — || October 12, 2004 || Moletai || Molėtai Obs. || — || align=right | 3.3 km || 
|-id=626 bgcolor=#E9E9E9
| 368626 ||  || — || October 8, 2004 || Kitt Peak || Spacewatch || — || align=right | 2.2 km || 
|-id=627 bgcolor=#E9E9E9
| 368627 ||  || — || September 8, 2004 || Socorro || LINEAR || — || align=right | 3.2 km || 
|-id=628 bgcolor=#E9E9E9
| 368628 ||  || — || October 20, 2004 || Mérida || Llano del Hato Obs. || HOF || align=right | 3.0 km || 
|-id=629 bgcolor=#E9E9E9
| 368629 ||  || — || November 3, 2004 || Anderson Mesa || LONEOS || DOR || align=right | 3.0 km || 
|-id=630 bgcolor=#E9E9E9
| 368630 ||  || — || September 22, 2004 || Socorro || LINEAR || GEF || align=right | 1.7 km || 
|-id=631 bgcolor=#d6d6d6
| 368631 ||  || — || November 12, 2004 || Catalina || CSS || — || align=right | 2.6 km || 
|-id=632 bgcolor=#E9E9E9
| 368632 ||  || — || November 7, 2004 || Socorro || LINEAR || — || align=right | 2.5 km || 
|-id=633 bgcolor=#d6d6d6
| 368633 ||  || — || December 11, 2004 || Kitt Peak || Spacewatch || — || align=right | 3.2 km || 
|-id=634 bgcolor=#E9E9E9
| 368634 ||  || — || December 11, 2004 || Catalina || CSS || GEF || align=right | 1.9 km || 
|-id=635 bgcolor=#d6d6d6
| 368635 ||  || — || December 13, 2004 || Kitt Peak || Spacewatch || — || align=right | 3.6 km || 
|-id=636 bgcolor=#E9E9E9
| 368636 ||  || — || December 18, 2004 || Mount Lemmon || Mount Lemmon Survey || — || align=right | 2.1 km || 
|-id=637 bgcolor=#d6d6d6
| 368637 ||  || — || December 18, 2004 || Mount Lemmon || Mount Lemmon Survey || EOS || align=right | 2.1 km || 
|-id=638 bgcolor=#d6d6d6
| 368638 ||  || — || December 18, 2004 || Mount Lemmon || Mount Lemmon Survey || — || align=right | 3.9 km || 
|-id=639 bgcolor=#d6d6d6
| 368639 ||  || — || January 15, 2005 || Socorro || LINEAR || EOS || align=right | 2.8 km || 
|-id=640 bgcolor=#d6d6d6
| 368640 ||  || — || February 1, 2005 || Catalina || CSS || — || align=right | 4.4 km || 
|-id=641 bgcolor=#fefefe
| 368641 ||  || — || February 1, 2005 || Kitt Peak || Spacewatch || NYS || align=right data-sort-value="0.65" | 650 m || 
|-id=642 bgcolor=#d6d6d6
| 368642 ||  || — || February 2, 2005 || Catalina || CSS || — || align=right | 4.9 km || 
|-id=643 bgcolor=#d6d6d6
| 368643 ||  || — || February 2, 2005 || Kitt Peak || Spacewatch || EUP || align=right | 6.9 km || 
|-id=644 bgcolor=#d6d6d6
| 368644 ||  || — || February 1, 2005 || Kitt Peak || Spacewatch || — || align=right | 3.5 km || 
|-id=645 bgcolor=#d6d6d6
| 368645 ||  || — || February 1, 2005 || Catalina || CSS || — || align=right | 3.8 km || 
|-id=646 bgcolor=#fefefe
| 368646 ||  || — || March 2, 2005 || Catalina || CSS || NYS || align=right data-sort-value="0.77" | 770 m || 
|-id=647 bgcolor=#fefefe
| 368647 ||  || — || February 9, 2005 || Socorro || LINEAR || FLO || align=right data-sort-value="0.74" | 740 m || 
|-id=648 bgcolor=#fefefe
| 368648 ||  || — || March 4, 2005 || Kitt Peak || Spacewatch || NYS || align=right data-sort-value="0.89" | 890 m || 
|-id=649 bgcolor=#d6d6d6
| 368649 ||  || — || March 7, 2005 || Socorro || LINEAR || — || align=right | 4.5 km || 
|-id=650 bgcolor=#d6d6d6
| 368650 ||  || — || March 9, 2005 || Mount Lemmon || Mount Lemmon Survey || — || align=right | 3.6 km || 
|-id=651 bgcolor=#d6d6d6
| 368651 ||  || — || March 10, 2005 || Mount Lemmon || Mount Lemmon Survey || — || align=right | 3.7 km || 
|-id=652 bgcolor=#d6d6d6
| 368652 ||  || — || March 9, 2005 || Mount Lemmon || Mount Lemmon Survey || — || align=right | 3.7 km || 
|-id=653 bgcolor=#fefefe
| 368653 ||  || — || March 4, 2005 || Catalina || CSS || FLO || align=right data-sort-value="0.80" | 800 m || 
|-id=654 bgcolor=#fefefe
| 368654 ||  || — || March 9, 2005 || Kitt Peak || Spacewatch || — || align=right data-sort-value="0.94" | 940 m || 
|-id=655 bgcolor=#d6d6d6
| 368655 ||  || — || March 11, 2005 || Mount Lemmon || Mount Lemmon Survey || VER || align=right | 3.7 km || 
|-id=656 bgcolor=#fefefe
| 368656 ||  || — || March 11, 2005 || Kitt Peak || Spacewatch || — || align=right data-sort-value="0.65" | 650 m || 
|-id=657 bgcolor=#fefefe
| 368657 ||  || — || March 7, 2005 || Socorro || LINEAR || — || align=right data-sort-value="0.94" | 940 m || 
|-id=658 bgcolor=#fefefe
| 368658 ||  || — || March 10, 2005 || Kitt Peak || Spacewatch || FLO || align=right data-sort-value="0.90" | 900 m || 
|-id=659 bgcolor=#fefefe
| 368659 ||  || — || March 11, 2005 || Mount Lemmon || Mount Lemmon Survey || — || align=right data-sort-value="0.80" | 800 m || 
|-id=660 bgcolor=#fefefe
| 368660 ||  || — || April 2, 2005 || Kitt Peak || Spacewatch || ERI || align=right | 1.4 km || 
|-id=661 bgcolor=#fefefe
| 368661 ||  || — || March 10, 2005 || Catalina || CSS || — || align=right data-sort-value="0.94" | 940 m || 
|-id=662 bgcolor=#fefefe
| 368662 ||  || — || March 3, 2005 || Catalina || CSS || NYS || align=right data-sort-value="0.58" | 580 m || 
|-id=663 bgcolor=#fefefe
| 368663 ||  || — || April 10, 2005 || Mount Lemmon || Mount Lemmon Survey || MAS || align=right data-sort-value="0.80" | 800 m || 
|-id=664 bgcolor=#FFC2E0
| 368664 ||  || — || May 6, 2005 || Kitt Peak || Spacewatch || AMO || align=right data-sort-value="0.63" | 630 m || 
|-id=665 bgcolor=#fefefe
| 368665 ||  || — || May 8, 2005 || Catalina || CSS || NYS || align=right data-sort-value="0.87" | 870 m || 
|-id=666 bgcolor=#fefefe
| 368666 ||  || — || May 8, 2005 || Mount Lemmon || Mount Lemmon Survey || — || align=right data-sort-value="0.87" | 870 m || 
|-id=667 bgcolor=#fefefe
| 368667 ||  || — || May 11, 2005 || Mount Lemmon || Mount Lemmon Survey || NYS || align=right data-sort-value="0.77" | 770 m || 
|-id=668 bgcolor=#fefefe
| 368668 ||  || — || April 11, 2005 || Kitt Peak || Spacewatch || NYS || align=right data-sort-value="0.61" | 610 m || 
|-id=669 bgcolor=#fefefe
| 368669 ||  || — || June 8, 2005 || Kitt Peak || Spacewatch || — || align=right data-sort-value="0.96" | 960 m || 
|-id=670 bgcolor=#d6d6d6
| 368670 ||  || — || July 2, 2005 || Kitt Peak || Spacewatch || 3:2 || align=right | 5.1 km || 
|-id=671 bgcolor=#fefefe
| 368671 ||  || — || July 5, 2005 || Palomar || NEAT || — || align=right | 1.2 km || 
|-id=672 bgcolor=#fefefe
| 368672 ||  || — || July 30, 2005 || Palomar || NEAT || H || align=right data-sort-value="0.48" | 480 m || 
|-id=673 bgcolor=#E9E9E9
| 368673 ||  || — || August 24, 2005 || Palomar || NEAT || — || align=right | 1.0 km || 
|-id=674 bgcolor=#E9E9E9
| 368674 ||  || — || August 27, 2005 || Anderson Mesa || LONEOS || — || align=right data-sort-value="0.75" | 750 m || 
|-id=675 bgcolor=#E9E9E9
| 368675 ||  || — || August 27, 2005 || Kitt Peak || Spacewatch || — || align=right | 1.1 km || 
|-id=676 bgcolor=#E9E9E9
| 368676 ||  || — || August 26, 2005 || Palomar || NEAT || — || align=right | 1.3 km || 
|-id=677 bgcolor=#d6d6d6
| 368677 ||  || — || August 28, 2005 || Siding Spring || SSS || 3:2 || align=right | 5.3 km || 
|-id=678 bgcolor=#E9E9E9
| 368678 ||  || — || August 29, 2005 || Kitt Peak || Spacewatch || — || align=right data-sort-value="0.71" | 710 m || 
|-id=679 bgcolor=#E9E9E9
| 368679 ||  || — || August 25, 2005 || Palomar || NEAT || — || align=right data-sort-value="0.68" | 680 m || 
|-id=680 bgcolor=#E9E9E9
| 368680 ||  || — || August 30, 2005 || Palomar || NEAT || MAR || align=right | 1.2 km || 
|-id=681 bgcolor=#E9E9E9
| 368681 ||  || — || August 31, 2005 || Kitt Peak || Spacewatch || — || align=right | 1.0 km || 
|-id=682 bgcolor=#E9E9E9
| 368682 ||  || — || September 1, 2005 || Palomar || NEAT || MAR || align=right | 1.4 km || 
|-id=683 bgcolor=#E9E9E9
| 368683 ||  || — || September 6, 2005 || Uccle || T. Pauwels || — || align=right | 2.1 km || 
|-id=684 bgcolor=#d6d6d6
| 368684 ||  || — || September 6, 2005 || Anderson Mesa || LONEOS || HIL3:2 || align=right | 7.2 km || 
|-id=685 bgcolor=#E9E9E9
| 368685 ||  || — || September 1, 2005 || Palomar || NEAT || EUN || align=right | 1.1 km || 
|-id=686 bgcolor=#E9E9E9
| 368686 ||  || — || September 24, 2005 || Kitt Peak || Spacewatch || KON || align=right | 1.9 km || 
|-id=687 bgcolor=#E9E9E9
| 368687 ||  || — || September 26, 2005 || Kitt Peak || Spacewatch || — || align=right data-sort-value="0.97" | 970 m || 
|-id=688 bgcolor=#E9E9E9
| 368688 ||  || — || September 23, 2005 || Kitt Peak || Spacewatch || — || align=right data-sort-value="0.98" | 980 m || 
|-id=689 bgcolor=#E9E9E9
| 368689 ||  || — || September 24, 2005 || Kitt Peak || Spacewatch || — || align=right data-sort-value="0.90" | 900 m || 
|-id=690 bgcolor=#E9E9E9
| 368690 ||  || — || January 6, 1998 || Kitt Peak || Spacewatch || — || align=right | 1.3 km || 
|-id=691 bgcolor=#E9E9E9
| 368691 ||  || — || September 26, 2005 || Kitt Peak || Spacewatch || — || align=right | 1.5 km || 
|-id=692 bgcolor=#E9E9E9
| 368692 ||  || — || September 24, 2005 || Kitt Peak || Spacewatch || — || align=right data-sort-value="0.78" | 780 m || 
|-id=693 bgcolor=#E9E9E9
| 368693 ||  || — || September 24, 2005 || Kitt Peak || Spacewatch || RAF || align=right data-sort-value="0.84" | 840 m || 
|-id=694 bgcolor=#E9E9E9
| 368694 ||  || — || September 24, 2005 || Kitt Peak || Spacewatch || — || align=right | 1.3 km || 
|-id=695 bgcolor=#E9E9E9
| 368695 ||  || — || September 24, 2005 || Kitt Peak || Spacewatch || — || align=right data-sort-value="0.86" | 860 m || 
|-id=696 bgcolor=#E9E9E9
| 368696 ||  || — || September 27, 2005 || Kitt Peak || Spacewatch || — || align=right | 1.1 km || 
|-id=697 bgcolor=#E9E9E9
| 368697 ||  || — || September 27, 2005 || Socorro || LINEAR || — || align=right | 1.7 km || 
|-id=698 bgcolor=#E9E9E9
| 368698 ||  || — || September 26, 2005 || Kitt Peak || Spacewatch || — || align=right data-sort-value="0.72" | 720 m || 
|-id=699 bgcolor=#E9E9E9
| 368699 ||  || — || September 26, 2005 || Palomar || NEAT || EUN || align=right | 1.3 km || 
|-id=700 bgcolor=#E9E9E9
| 368700 ||  || — || September 27, 2005 || Kitt Peak || Spacewatch || — || align=right | 1.4 km || 
|}

368701–368800 

|-bgcolor=#E9E9E9
| 368701 ||  || — || September 29, 2005 || Kitt Peak || Spacewatch || — || align=right | 2.1 km || 
|-id=702 bgcolor=#E9E9E9
| 368702 ||  || — || September 30, 2005 || Kitt Peak || Spacewatch || — || align=right | 1.3 km || 
|-id=703 bgcolor=#E9E9E9
| 368703 ||  || — || September 28, 2005 || Cordell-Lorenz || D. T. Durig || — || align=right | 1.2 km || 
|-id=704 bgcolor=#E9E9E9
| 368704 Roelgathier ||  ||  || September 21, 2005 || Uccle || T. Pauwels || — || align=right | 1.1 km || 
|-id=705 bgcolor=#E9E9E9
| 368705 ||  || — || September 30, 2005 || Kitt Peak || Spacewatch || — || align=right | 1.5 km || 
|-id=706 bgcolor=#E9E9E9
| 368706 ||  || — || September 30, 2005 || Kitt Peak || Spacewatch || — || align=right data-sort-value="0.76" | 760 m || 
|-id=707 bgcolor=#E9E9E9
| 368707 ||  || — || September 27, 2005 || Kitt Peak || Spacewatch || — || align=right data-sort-value="0.57" | 570 m || 
|-id=708 bgcolor=#E9E9E9
| 368708 ||  || — || September 30, 2005 || Catalina || CSS || — || align=right | 1.0 km || 
|-id=709 bgcolor=#E9E9E9
| 368709 ||  || — || September 25, 2005 || Kitt Peak || Spacewatch || — || align=right | 1.1 km || 
|-id=710 bgcolor=#E9E9E9
| 368710 ||  || — || October 1, 2005 || Mount Lemmon || Mount Lemmon Survey || — || align=right data-sort-value="0.78" | 780 m || 
|-id=711 bgcolor=#E9E9E9
| 368711 ||  || — || October 1, 2005 || Mount Lemmon || Mount Lemmon Survey || — || align=right | 1.3 km || 
|-id=712 bgcolor=#E9E9E9
| 368712 ||  || — || October 1, 2005 || Catalina || CSS || — || align=right data-sort-value="0.99" | 990 m || 
|-id=713 bgcolor=#E9E9E9
| 368713 ||  || — || October 7, 2005 || Mount Lemmon || Mount Lemmon Survey || — || align=right | 1.3 km || 
|-id=714 bgcolor=#E9E9E9
| 368714 ||  || — || October 4, 2005 || Palomar || NEAT || — || align=right | 1.8 km || 
|-id=715 bgcolor=#E9E9E9
| 368715 ||  || — || October 7, 2005 || Kitt Peak || Spacewatch || — || align=right data-sort-value="0.89" | 890 m || 
|-id=716 bgcolor=#E9E9E9
| 368716 ||  || — || October 7, 2005 || Mount Lemmon || Mount Lemmon Survey || — || align=right | 1.2 km || 
|-id=717 bgcolor=#E9E9E9
| 368717 ||  || — || October 9, 2005 || Kitt Peak || Spacewatch || ADE || align=right | 2.7 km || 
|-id=718 bgcolor=#E9E9E9
| 368718 ||  || — || October 9, 2005 || Kitt Peak || Spacewatch || — || align=right | 1.5 km || 
|-id=719 bgcolor=#E9E9E9
| 368719 Asparuh ||  ||  || October 25, 2005 || Plana || F. Fratev || — || align=right | 2.0 km || 
|-id=720 bgcolor=#E9E9E9
| 368720 ||  || — || October 22, 2005 || Kitt Peak || Spacewatch || — || align=right data-sort-value="0.75" | 750 m || 
|-id=721 bgcolor=#E9E9E9
| 368721 ||  || — || October 23, 2005 || Catalina || CSS || — || align=right | 1.7 km || 
|-id=722 bgcolor=#E9E9E9
| 368722 ||  || — || October 22, 2005 || Goodricke-Pigott || R. A. Tucker || — || align=right data-sort-value="0.95" | 950 m || 
|-id=723 bgcolor=#E9E9E9
| 368723 ||  || — || October 23, 2005 || Catalina || CSS || critical || align=right | 1.2 km || 
|-id=724 bgcolor=#E9E9E9
| 368724 ||  || — || October 23, 2005 || Catalina || CSS || — || align=right | 1.8 km || 
|-id=725 bgcolor=#fefefe
| 368725 ||  || — || October 24, 2005 || Anderson Mesa || LONEOS || H || align=right data-sort-value="0.72" | 720 m || 
|-id=726 bgcolor=#E9E9E9
| 368726 ||  || — || October 25, 2005 || Mount Lemmon || Mount Lemmon Survey || — || align=right | 1.7 km || 
|-id=727 bgcolor=#E9E9E9
| 368727 ||  || — || October 23, 2005 || Catalina || CSS || — || align=right | 1.2 km || 
|-id=728 bgcolor=#E9E9E9
| 368728 ||  || — || October 24, 2005 || Kitt Peak || Spacewatch || — || align=right data-sort-value="0.85" | 850 m || 
|-id=729 bgcolor=#E9E9E9
| 368729 ||  || — || October 22, 2005 || Kitt Peak || Spacewatch || — || align=right | 1.6 km || 
|-id=730 bgcolor=#E9E9E9
| 368730 ||  || — || October 22, 2005 || Kitt Peak || Spacewatch || critical || align=right | 1.3 km || 
|-id=731 bgcolor=#E9E9E9
| 368731 ||  || — || October 22, 2005 || Kitt Peak || Spacewatch || — || align=right | 1.8 km || 
|-id=732 bgcolor=#E9E9E9
| 368732 ||  || — || October 24, 2005 || Kitt Peak || Spacewatch || — || align=right | 1.0 km || 
|-id=733 bgcolor=#E9E9E9
| 368733 ||  || — || October 24, 2005 || Kitt Peak || Spacewatch || ADE || align=right | 2.2 km || 
|-id=734 bgcolor=#E9E9E9
| 368734 ||  || — || October 25, 2005 || Kitt Peak || Spacewatch || — || align=right | 1.6 km || 
|-id=735 bgcolor=#E9E9E9
| 368735 ||  || — || October 27, 2005 || Mount Lemmon || Mount Lemmon Survey || JUN || align=right | 1.5 km || 
|-id=736 bgcolor=#E9E9E9
| 368736 ||  || — || October 25, 2005 || Kitt Peak || Spacewatch || — || align=right | 1.3 km || 
|-id=737 bgcolor=#E9E9E9
| 368737 ||  || — || October 27, 2005 || Mount Lemmon || Mount Lemmon Survey || — || align=right | 2.5 km || 
|-id=738 bgcolor=#E9E9E9
| 368738 ||  || — || October 27, 2005 || Catalina || CSS || BRG || align=right | 1.5 km || 
|-id=739 bgcolor=#E9E9E9
| 368739 ||  || — || October 26, 2005 || Kitt Peak || Spacewatch || — || align=right | 1.4 km || 
|-id=740 bgcolor=#E9E9E9
| 368740 ||  || — || October 26, 2005 || Kitt Peak || Spacewatch || GEF || align=right | 1.4 km || 
|-id=741 bgcolor=#d6d6d6
| 368741 ||  || — || October 27, 2005 || Mount Lemmon || Mount Lemmon Survey || — || align=right | 3.3 km || 
|-id=742 bgcolor=#E9E9E9
| 368742 ||  || — || October 3, 2005 || Palomar || NEAT || EUN || align=right | 1.2 km || 
|-id=743 bgcolor=#E9E9E9
| 368743 ||  || — || October 30, 2005 || Kitt Peak || Spacewatch || — || align=right | 2.1 km || 
|-id=744 bgcolor=#E9E9E9
| 368744 ||  || — || September 29, 2005 || Kitt Peak || Spacewatch || MAR || align=right | 1.3 km || 
|-id=745 bgcolor=#E9E9E9
| 368745 ||  || — || October 30, 2005 || Kitt Peak || Spacewatch || — || align=right | 1.2 km || 
|-id=746 bgcolor=#E9E9E9
| 368746 ||  || — || October 25, 2005 || Kitt Peak || Spacewatch || NEM || align=right | 2.0 km || 
|-id=747 bgcolor=#E9E9E9
| 368747 ||  || — || October 26, 2005 || Kitt Peak || Spacewatch || — || align=right | 1.4 km || 
|-id=748 bgcolor=#E9E9E9
| 368748 ||  || — || October 29, 2005 || Catalina || CSS || — || align=right | 1.4 km || 
|-id=749 bgcolor=#d6d6d6
| 368749 ||  || — || October 28, 2005 || Mount Lemmon || Mount Lemmon Survey || BRA || align=right | 2.2 km || 
|-id=750 bgcolor=#E9E9E9
| 368750 ||  || — || October 28, 2005 || Catalina || CSS || — || align=right | 1.0 km || 
|-id=751 bgcolor=#E9E9E9
| 368751 ||  || — || October 29, 2005 || Kitt Peak || Spacewatch || — || align=right | 1.8 km || 
|-id=752 bgcolor=#E9E9E9
| 368752 ||  || — || October 25, 2005 || Socorro || LINEAR || JUN || align=right | 1.1 km || 
|-id=753 bgcolor=#E9E9E9
| 368753 ||  || — || October 23, 2005 || Catalina || CSS || — || align=right | 1.2 km || 
|-id=754 bgcolor=#E9E9E9
| 368754 ||  || — || October 23, 2005 || Catalina || CSS || — || align=right | 1.5 km || 
|-id=755 bgcolor=#E9E9E9
| 368755 ||  || — || October 20, 2005 || Apache Point || A. C. Becker || — || align=right data-sort-value="0.76" | 760 m || 
|-id=756 bgcolor=#E9E9E9
| 368756 ||  || — || October 27, 2005 || Apache Point || A. C. Becker || — || align=right | 1.4 km || 
|-id=757 bgcolor=#E9E9E9
| 368757 ||  || — || November 3, 2005 || Catalina || CSS || — || align=right | 1.7 km || 
|-id=758 bgcolor=#E9E9E9
| 368758 ||  || — || November 6, 2005 || Kitt Peak || Spacewatch || — || align=right | 2.2 km || 
|-id=759 bgcolor=#E9E9E9
| 368759 ||  || — || November 1, 2005 || Anderson Mesa || LONEOS || ADE || align=right | 2.4 km || 
|-id=760 bgcolor=#E9E9E9
| 368760 ||  || — || October 29, 2005 || Mount Lemmon || Mount Lemmon Survey || HEN || align=right | 1.0 km || 
|-id=761 bgcolor=#E9E9E9
| 368761 ||  || — || November 1, 2005 || Mount Lemmon || Mount Lemmon Survey || — || align=right | 1.4 km || 
|-id=762 bgcolor=#E9E9E9
| 368762 ||  || — || November 2, 2005 || Mount Lemmon || Mount Lemmon Survey || — || align=right | 1.5 km || 
|-id=763 bgcolor=#E9E9E9
| 368763 ||  || — || November 6, 2005 || Kitt Peak || Spacewatch || — || align=right | 1.3 km || 
|-id=764 bgcolor=#E9E9E9
| 368764 ||  || — || November 1, 2005 || Kitt Peak || Spacewatch || — || align=right | 1.5 km || 
|-id=765 bgcolor=#E9E9E9
| 368765 ||  || — || November 6, 2005 || Mount Lemmon || Mount Lemmon Survey || — || align=right | 2.4 km || 
|-id=766 bgcolor=#E9E9E9
| 368766 ||  || — || November 6, 2005 || Mount Lemmon || Mount Lemmon Survey || — || align=right | 2.6 km || 
|-id=767 bgcolor=#E9E9E9
| 368767 ||  || — || November 12, 2005 || Kitt Peak || Spacewatch || — || align=right | 1.5 km || 
|-id=768 bgcolor=#E9E9E9
| 368768 ||  || — || November 20, 2005 || Palomar || NEAT || — || align=right | 1.7 km || 
|-id=769 bgcolor=#E9E9E9
| 368769 ||  || — || November 21, 2005 || Kitt Peak || Spacewatch || — || align=right | 2.2 km || 
|-id=770 bgcolor=#E9E9E9
| 368770 ||  || — || November 22, 2005 || Kitt Peak || Spacewatch || — || align=right | 1.3 km || 
|-id=771 bgcolor=#E9E9E9
| 368771 ||  || — || November 22, 2005 || Junk Bond || D. Healy || — || align=right | 3.3 km || 
|-id=772 bgcolor=#E9E9E9
| 368772 ||  || — || November 21, 2005 || Kitt Peak || Spacewatch || — || align=right | 1.7 km || 
|-id=773 bgcolor=#E9E9E9
| 368773 ||  || — || November 21, 2005 || Kitt Peak || Spacewatch || — || align=right | 1.0 km || 
|-id=774 bgcolor=#E9E9E9
| 368774 ||  || — || November 25, 2005 || Kitt Peak || Spacewatch || — || align=right | 2.1 km || 
|-id=775 bgcolor=#E9E9E9
| 368775 ||  || — || November 22, 2005 || Kitt Peak || Spacewatch || — || align=right | 2.9 km || 
|-id=776 bgcolor=#E9E9E9
| 368776 ||  || — || November 25, 2005 || Mount Lemmon || Mount Lemmon Survey || — || align=right | 1.1 km || 
|-id=777 bgcolor=#E9E9E9
| 368777 ||  || — || November 29, 2005 || Catalina || CSS || ADE || align=right | 2.0 km || 
|-id=778 bgcolor=#fefefe
| 368778 ||  || — || November 25, 2005 || Catalina || CSS || — || align=right data-sort-value="0.75" | 750 m || 
|-id=779 bgcolor=#E9E9E9
| 368779 ||  || — || November 30, 2005 || Socorro || LINEAR || — || align=right | 2.0 km || 
|-id=780 bgcolor=#E9E9E9
| 368780 ||  || — || November 28, 2005 || Kitt Peak || Spacewatch || — || align=right | 2.1 km || 
|-id=781 bgcolor=#E9E9E9
| 368781 ||  || — || November 25, 2005 || Catalina || CSS || — || align=right | 2.1 km || 
|-id=782 bgcolor=#E9E9E9
| 368782 ||  || — || November 29, 2005 || Mount Lemmon || Mount Lemmon Survey || — || align=right | 2.7 km || 
|-id=783 bgcolor=#E9E9E9
| 368783 ||  || — || November 30, 2005 || Kitt Peak || Spacewatch || — || align=right | 3.2 km || 
|-id=784 bgcolor=#E9E9E9
| 368784 ||  || — || November 21, 2005 || Catalina || CSS || — || align=right | 2.3 km || 
|-id=785 bgcolor=#E9E9E9
| 368785 ||  || — || November 30, 2005 || Socorro || LINEAR || — || align=right | 3.6 km || 
|-id=786 bgcolor=#E9E9E9
| 368786 ||  || — || November 30, 2005 || Mount Lemmon || Mount Lemmon Survey || — || align=right | 3.1 km || 
|-id=787 bgcolor=#E9E9E9
| 368787 ||  || — || December 1, 2005 || Kitt Peak || Spacewatch || — || align=right | 1.3 km || 
|-id=788 bgcolor=#E9E9E9
| 368788 ||  || — || December 1, 2005 || Socorro || LINEAR || — || align=right | 2.3 km || 
|-id=789 bgcolor=#E9E9E9
| 368789 ||  || — || December 7, 2005 || Mayhill || A. Lowe || — || align=right | 1.0 km || 
|-id=790 bgcolor=#FFC2E0
| 368790 ||  || — || December 7, 2005 || Catalina || CSS || AMO || align=right data-sort-value="0.39" | 390 m || 
|-id=791 bgcolor=#E9E9E9
| 368791 ||  || — || December 5, 2005 || Mount Lemmon || Mount Lemmon Survey || — || align=right | 2.1 km || 
|-id=792 bgcolor=#E9E9E9
| 368792 ||  || — || December 2, 2005 || Kitt Peak || Spacewatch || — || align=right | 2.6 km || 
|-id=793 bgcolor=#E9E9E9
| 368793 ||  || — || December 2, 2005 || Kitt Peak || Spacewatch || NEM || align=right | 2.3 km || 
|-id=794 bgcolor=#E9E9E9
| 368794 ||  || — || December 4, 2005 || Kitt Peak || Spacewatch || — || align=right | 2.0 km || 
|-id=795 bgcolor=#E9E9E9
| 368795 ||  || — || December 1, 2005 || Catalina || CSS || JUN || align=right | 1.2 km || 
|-id=796 bgcolor=#E9E9E9
| 368796 ||  || — || December 2, 2005 || Catalina || CSS || EUN || align=right | 1.6 km || 
|-id=797 bgcolor=#E9E9E9
| 368797 ||  || — || December 23, 2005 || Kitt Peak || Spacewatch || — || align=right | 2.0 km || 
|-id=798 bgcolor=#E9E9E9
| 368798 ||  || — || December 25, 2005 || Kitt Peak || Spacewatch || — || align=right | 2.8 km || 
|-id=799 bgcolor=#E9E9E9
| 368799 ||  || — || December 21, 2005 || Catalina || CSS || — || align=right | 1.6 km || 
|-id=800 bgcolor=#E9E9E9
| 368800 ||  || — || December 22, 2005 || Kitt Peak || Spacewatch || — || align=right | 3.1 km || 
|}

368801–368900 

|-bgcolor=#E9E9E9
| 368801 ||  || — || December 24, 2005 || Kitt Peak || Spacewatch || — || align=right | 1.7 km || 
|-id=802 bgcolor=#E9E9E9
| 368802 ||  || — || December 6, 2005 || Kitt Peak || Spacewatch || PAD || align=right | 2.1 km || 
|-id=803 bgcolor=#E9E9E9
| 368803 ||  || — || December 24, 2005 || Kitt Peak || Spacewatch || — || align=right | 1.7 km || 
|-id=804 bgcolor=#E9E9E9
| 368804 ||  || — || December 26, 2005 || Kitt Peak || Spacewatch || WIT || align=right data-sort-value="0.97" | 970 m || 
|-id=805 bgcolor=#E9E9E9
| 368805 ||  || — || December 23, 2005 || Catalina || CSS || — || align=right | 2.2 km || 
|-id=806 bgcolor=#E9E9E9
| 368806 ||  || — || December 28, 2005 || Palomar || NEAT || BRU || align=right | 4.5 km || 
|-id=807 bgcolor=#E9E9E9
| 368807 ||  || — || December 25, 2005 || Kitt Peak || Spacewatch || — || align=right | 2.4 km || 
|-id=808 bgcolor=#E9E9E9
| 368808 ||  || — || December 26, 2005 || Kitt Peak || Spacewatch || AGN || align=right | 1.3 km || 
|-id=809 bgcolor=#d6d6d6
| 368809 ||  || — || December 26, 2005 || Kitt Peak || Spacewatch || SAN || align=right | 2.0 km || 
|-id=810 bgcolor=#FA8072
| 368810 ||  || — || December 22, 2005 || Catalina || CSS || — || align=right | 1.8 km || 
|-id=811 bgcolor=#fefefe
| 368811 ||  || — || December 29, 2005 || Catalina || CSS || H || align=right | 1.0 km || 
|-id=812 bgcolor=#FA8072
| 368812 ||  || — || January 4, 2006 || Catalina || CSS || — || align=right | 2.6 km || 
|-id=813 bgcolor=#E9E9E9
| 368813 ||  || — || January 5, 2006 || Catalina || CSS || — || align=right | 1.3 km || 
|-id=814 bgcolor=#d6d6d6
| 368814 ||  || — || January 8, 2006 || Mount Lemmon || Mount Lemmon Survey || BRA || align=right | 1.5 km || 
|-id=815 bgcolor=#E9E9E9
| 368815 ||  || — || January 6, 2006 || Kitt Peak || Spacewatch || HOF || align=right | 2.7 km || 
|-id=816 bgcolor=#d6d6d6
| 368816 ||  || — || January 7, 2006 || Mount Lemmon || Mount Lemmon Survey || — || align=right | 2.9 km || 
|-id=817 bgcolor=#E9E9E9
| 368817 ||  || — || January 5, 2006 || Mount Lemmon || Mount Lemmon Survey || MRX || align=right | 1.1 km || 
|-id=818 bgcolor=#FA8072
| 368818 ||  || — || January 21, 2006 || Palomar || NEAT || — || align=right | 2.2 km || 
|-id=819 bgcolor=#E9E9E9
| 368819 ||  || — || December 28, 2005 || Kitt Peak || Spacewatch || AEO || align=right | 1.1 km || 
|-id=820 bgcolor=#d6d6d6
| 368820 ||  || — || January 23, 2006 || Kitt Peak || Spacewatch || — || align=right | 3.8 km || 
|-id=821 bgcolor=#E9E9E9
| 368821 ||  || — || January 25, 2006 || Kitt Peak || Spacewatch || WAT || align=right | 2.5 km || 
|-id=822 bgcolor=#d6d6d6
| 368822 ||  || — || January 8, 2006 || Mount Lemmon || Mount Lemmon Survey || EUP || align=right | 3.3 km || 
|-id=823 bgcolor=#d6d6d6
| 368823 ||  || — || January 25, 2006 || Kitt Peak || Spacewatch || THM || align=right | 1.9 km || 
|-id=824 bgcolor=#d6d6d6
| 368824 ||  || — || January 31, 2006 || Catalina || CSS || — || align=right | 3.4 km || 
|-id=825 bgcolor=#E9E9E9
| 368825 ||  || — || January 31, 2006 || Kitt Peak || Spacewatch || — || align=right | 2.6 km || 
|-id=826 bgcolor=#d6d6d6
| 368826 ||  || — || January 23, 2006 || Kitt Peak || Spacewatch || EOS || align=right | 2.3 km || 
|-id=827 bgcolor=#fefefe
| 368827 ||  || — || February 1, 2006 || Kitt Peak || Spacewatch || — || align=right data-sort-value="0.71" | 710 m || 
|-id=828 bgcolor=#d6d6d6
| 368828 ||  || — || January 23, 2006 || Kitt Peak || Spacewatch || THB || align=right | 3.5 km || 
|-id=829 bgcolor=#d6d6d6
| 368829 ||  || — || February 1, 2006 || Mount Lemmon || Mount Lemmon Survey || — || align=right | 2.7 km || 
|-id=830 bgcolor=#d6d6d6
| 368830 ||  || — || February 2, 2006 || Mount Lemmon || Mount Lemmon Survey || — || align=right | 4.8 km || 
|-id=831 bgcolor=#d6d6d6
| 368831 ||  || — || February 4, 2006 || Kitt Peak || Spacewatch || — || align=right | 2.9 km || 
|-id=832 bgcolor=#d6d6d6
| 368832 ||  || — || February 1, 2006 || Mount Lemmon || Mount Lemmon Survey || KOR || align=right | 1.8 km || 
|-id=833 bgcolor=#d6d6d6
| 368833 ||  || — || February 22, 2006 || Catalina || CSS || — || align=right | 4.0 km || 
|-id=834 bgcolor=#d6d6d6
| 368834 ||  || — || January 26, 2006 || Mount Lemmon || Mount Lemmon Survey || BRA || align=right | 1.7 km || 
|-id=835 bgcolor=#d6d6d6
| 368835 ||  || — || February 20, 2006 || Kitt Peak || Spacewatch || — || align=right | 2.4 km || 
|-id=836 bgcolor=#d6d6d6
| 368836 ||  || — || February 24, 2006 || Kitt Peak || Spacewatch || — || align=right | 3.1 km || 
|-id=837 bgcolor=#d6d6d6
| 368837 ||  || — || February 21, 2006 || Mount Lemmon || Mount Lemmon Survey || — || align=right | 2.5 km || 
|-id=838 bgcolor=#d6d6d6
| 368838 ||  || — || February 24, 2006 || Kitt Peak || Spacewatch || — || align=right | 3.4 km || 
|-id=839 bgcolor=#d6d6d6
| 368839 ||  || — || February 27, 2006 || Mount Lemmon || Mount Lemmon Survey || — || align=right | 2.9 km || 
|-id=840 bgcolor=#d6d6d6
| 368840 ||  || — || February 25, 2006 || Kitt Peak || Spacewatch || NAE || align=right | 3.5 km || 
|-id=841 bgcolor=#d6d6d6
| 368841 ||  || — || February 25, 2006 || Kitt Peak || Spacewatch || — || align=right | 2.6 km || 
|-id=842 bgcolor=#d6d6d6
| 368842 ||  || — || February 24, 2006 || Palomar || NEAT || — || align=right | 4.0 km || 
|-id=843 bgcolor=#d6d6d6
| 368843 ||  || — || February 20, 2006 || Kitt Peak || Spacewatch || — || align=right | 2.4 km || 
|-id=844 bgcolor=#d6d6d6
| 368844 ||  || — || March 2, 2006 || Kitt Peak || Spacewatch || — || align=right | 2.3 km || 
|-id=845 bgcolor=#d6d6d6
| 368845 ||  || — || March 2, 2006 || Kitt Peak || Spacewatch || — || align=right | 3.2 km || 
|-id=846 bgcolor=#d6d6d6
| 368846 ||  || — || March 2, 2006 || Kitt Peak || Spacewatch || EOS || align=right | 2.4 km || 
|-id=847 bgcolor=#d6d6d6
| 368847 ||  || — || March 5, 2006 || Kitt Peak || Spacewatch || — || align=right | 2.5 km || 
|-id=848 bgcolor=#d6d6d6
| 368848 ||  || — || March 5, 2006 || Kitt Peak || Spacewatch || — || align=right | 2.8 km || 
|-id=849 bgcolor=#d6d6d6
| 368849 ||  || — || March 5, 2006 || Kitt Peak || Spacewatch || — || align=right | 3.1 km || 
|-id=850 bgcolor=#d6d6d6
| 368850 ||  || — || March 23, 2006 || Kitt Peak || Spacewatch || — || align=right | 2.5 km || 
|-id=851 bgcolor=#d6d6d6
| 368851 ||  || — || March 24, 2006 || Mount Lemmon || Mount Lemmon Survey || — || align=right | 2.2 km || 
|-id=852 bgcolor=#fefefe
| 368852 ||  || — || April 2, 2006 || Kitt Peak || Spacewatch || — || align=right data-sort-value="0.99" | 990 m || 
|-id=853 bgcolor=#d6d6d6
| 368853 ||  || — || April 25, 2006 || Kitt Peak || Spacewatch || — || align=right | 3.1 km || 
|-id=854 bgcolor=#fefefe
| 368854 ||  || — || April 30, 2006 || Kitt Peak || Spacewatch || — || align=right data-sort-value="0.54" | 540 m || 
|-id=855 bgcolor=#fefefe
| 368855 ||  || — || April 30, 2006 || Kitt Peak || Spacewatch || — || align=right data-sort-value="0.76" | 760 m || 
|-id=856 bgcolor=#FA8072
| 368856 ||  || — || April 30, 2006 || Kitt Peak || Spacewatch || — || align=right data-sort-value="0.87" | 870 m || 
|-id=857 bgcolor=#d6d6d6
| 368857 ||  || — || April 26, 2006 || Cerro Tololo || M. W. Buie || — || align=right | 3.2 km || 
|-id=858 bgcolor=#fefefe
| 368858 ||  || — || May 1, 2006 || Socorro || LINEAR || FLO || align=right data-sort-value="0.71" | 710 m || 
|-id=859 bgcolor=#d6d6d6
| 368859 ||  || — || May 6, 2006 || Mount Lemmon || Mount Lemmon Survey || THM || align=right | 2.7 km || 
|-id=860 bgcolor=#fefefe
| 368860 ||  || — || May 1, 2006 || Kitt Peak || Spacewatch || — || align=right data-sort-value="0.62" | 620 m || 
|-id=861 bgcolor=#fefefe
| 368861 ||  || — || July 21, 2006 || Mount Lemmon || Mount Lemmon Survey || MAS || align=right data-sort-value="0.94" | 940 m || 
|-id=862 bgcolor=#fefefe
| 368862 ||  || — || July 21, 2006 || Catalina || CSS || FLO || align=right data-sort-value="0.76" | 760 m || 
|-id=863 bgcolor=#fefefe
| 368863 ||  || — || August 12, 2006 || Palomar || NEAT || — || align=right data-sort-value="0.96" | 960 m || 
|-id=864 bgcolor=#fefefe
| 368864 ||  || — || August 14, 2006 || Siding Spring || SSS || — || align=right data-sort-value="0.82" | 820 m || 
|-id=865 bgcolor=#fefefe
| 368865 ||  || — || June 19, 2006 || Mount Lemmon || Mount Lemmon Survey || NYS || align=right data-sort-value="0.69" | 690 m || 
|-id=866 bgcolor=#FA8072
| 368866 ||  || — || August 18, 2006 || Kitt Peak || Spacewatch || — || align=right | 1.0 km || 
|-id=867 bgcolor=#fefefe
| 368867 ||  || — || August 21, 2006 || Palomar || NEAT || — || align=right data-sort-value="0.97" | 970 m || 
|-id=868 bgcolor=#fefefe
| 368868 ||  || — || August 24, 2006 || Palomar || NEAT || — || align=right | 1.0 km || 
|-id=869 bgcolor=#fefefe
| 368869 ||  || — || August 28, 2006 || Catalina || CSS || FLO || align=right data-sort-value="0.61" | 610 m || 
|-id=870 bgcolor=#fefefe
| 368870 ||  || — || August 28, 2006 || Catalina || CSS || — || align=right data-sort-value="0.74" | 740 m || 
|-id=871 bgcolor=#fefefe
| 368871 ||  || — || August 22, 2006 || Palomar || NEAT || — || align=right data-sort-value="0.72" | 720 m || 
|-id=872 bgcolor=#fefefe
| 368872 ||  || — || August 17, 2006 || Palomar || NEAT || — || align=right data-sort-value="0.87" | 870 m || 
|-id=873 bgcolor=#fefefe
| 368873 ||  || — || August 22, 2006 || Palomar || NEAT || FLO || align=right data-sort-value="0.68" | 680 m || 
|-id=874 bgcolor=#fefefe
| 368874 ||  || — || August 19, 2006 || Kitt Peak || Spacewatch || — || align=right data-sort-value="0.74" | 740 m || 
|-id=875 bgcolor=#fefefe
| 368875 ||  || — || August 19, 2006 || Kitt Peak || Spacewatch || — || align=right data-sort-value="0.79" | 790 m || 
|-id=876 bgcolor=#fefefe
| 368876 ||  || — || August 27, 2006 || Kitt Peak || Spacewatch || — || align=right data-sort-value="0.79" | 790 m || 
|-id=877 bgcolor=#fefefe
| 368877 ||  || — || September 14, 2006 || Palomar || NEAT || NYS || align=right data-sort-value="0.72" | 720 m || 
|-id=878 bgcolor=#fefefe
| 368878 ||  || — || September 14, 2006 || Palomar || NEAT || — || align=right data-sort-value="0.91" | 910 m || 
|-id=879 bgcolor=#fefefe
| 368879 ||  || — || September 15, 2006 || Kitt Peak || Spacewatch || — || align=right data-sort-value="0.71" | 710 m || 
|-id=880 bgcolor=#fefefe
| 368880 ||  || — || September 15, 2006 || Kitt Peak || Spacewatch || MAS || align=right data-sort-value="0.66" | 660 m || 
|-id=881 bgcolor=#fefefe
| 368881 ||  || — || September 17, 2006 || Mayhill || A. Lowe || — || align=right | 1.0 km || 
|-id=882 bgcolor=#fefefe
| 368882 ||  || — || August 20, 2006 || Palomar || NEAT || ERI || align=right | 1.5 km || 
|-id=883 bgcolor=#fefefe
| 368883 ||  || — || September 17, 2006 || Kitt Peak || Spacewatch || NYS || align=right data-sort-value="0.62" | 620 m || 
|-id=884 bgcolor=#fefefe
| 368884 ||  || — || September 18, 2006 || Catalina || CSS || — || align=right | 2.6 km || 
|-id=885 bgcolor=#fefefe
| 368885 ||  || — || September 18, 2006 || Catalina || CSS || — || align=right | 1.1 km || 
|-id=886 bgcolor=#fefefe
| 368886 ||  || — || September 20, 2006 || Catalina || CSS || V || align=right data-sort-value="0.87" | 870 m || 
|-id=887 bgcolor=#fefefe
| 368887 ||  || — || September 19, 2006 || Kitt Peak || Spacewatch || — || align=right data-sort-value="0.71" | 710 m || 
|-id=888 bgcolor=#fefefe
| 368888 ||  || — || September 18, 2006 || Kitt Peak || Spacewatch || V || align=right data-sort-value="0.60" | 600 m || 
|-id=889 bgcolor=#fefefe
| 368889 ||  || — || September 18, 2006 || Kitt Peak || Spacewatch || NYS || align=right data-sort-value="0.58" | 580 m || 
|-id=890 bgcolor=#fefefe
| 368890 ||  || — || September 18, 2006 || Kitt Peak || Spacewatch || NYS || align=right data-sort-value="0.69" | 690 m || 
|-id=891 bgcolor=#fefefe
| 368891 ||  || — || September 19, 2006 || Anderson Mesa || LONEOS || V || align=right data-sort-value="0.75" | 750 m || 
|-id=892 bgcolor=#fefefe
| 368892 ||  || — || September 15, 2006 || Kitt Peak || Spacewatch || MAS || align=right data-sort-value="0.66" | 660 m || 
|-id=893 bgcolor=#fefefe
| 368893 ||  || — || September 16, 2006 || Catalina || CSS || — || align=right | 1.1 km || 
|-id=894 bgcolor=#fefefe
| 368894 ||  || — || September 25, 2006 || Kitt Peak || Spacewatch || V || align=right data-sort-value="0.76" | 760 m || 
|-id=895 bgcolor=#fefefe
| 368895 ||  || — || September 26, 2006 || Catalina || CSS || ERI || align=right | 1.6 km || 
|-id=896 bgcolor=#fefefe
| 368896 ||  || — || September 26, 2006 || Catalina || CSS || — || align=right data-sort-value="0.80" | 800 m || 
|-id=897 bgcolor=#fefefe
| 368897 ||  || — || September 26, 2006 || Goodricke-Pigott || R. A. Tucker || — || align=right data-sort-value="0.93" | 930 m || 
|-id=898 bgcolor=#fefefe
| 368898 ||  || — || September 26, 2006 || Mount Lemmon || Mount Lemmon Survey || NYS || align=right data-sort-value="0.63" | 630 m || 
|-id=899 bgcolor=#fefefe
| 368899 ||  || — || September 26, 2006 || Kitt Peak || Spacewatch || NYS || align=right data-sort-value="0.57" | 570 m || 
|-id=900 bgcolor=#d6d6d6
| 368900 ||  || — || September 26, 2006 || Kitt Peak || Spacewatch || 3:2 || align=right | 5.1 km || 
|}

368901–369000 

|-bgcolor=#d6d6d6
| 368901 ||  || — || September 19, 2006 || Kitt Peak || Spacewatch || SHU3:2 || align=right | 6.0 km || 
|-id=902 bgcolor=#fefefe
| 368902 ||  || — || September 28, 2006 || Kitt Peak || Spacewatch || V || align=right data-sort-value="0.61" | 610 m || 
|-id=903 bgcolor=#fefefe
| 368903 ||  || — || September 30, 2006 || Catalina || CSS || NYS || align=right data-sort-value="0.77" | 770 m || 
|-id=904 bgcolor=#fefefe
| 368904 ||  || — || September 17, 2006 || Kitt Peak || Spacewatch || MAS || align=right data-sort-value="0.72" | 720 m || 
|-id=905 bgcolor=#fefefe
| 368905 ||  || — || October 11, 2006 || Kitt Peak || Spacewatch || EUT || align=right data-sort-value="0.66" | 660 m || 
|-id=906 bgcolor=#fefefe
| 368906 ||  || — || October 12, 2006 || Kitt Peak || Spacewatch || — || align=right data-sort-value="0.93" | 930 m || 
|-id=907 bgcolor=#fefefe
| 368907 ||  || — || August 20, 1995 || Kitt Peak || Spacewatch || NYS || align=right data-sort-value="0.64" | 640 m || 
|-id=908 bgcolor=#fefefe
| 368908 ||  || — || October 12, 2006 || Kitt Peak || Spacewatch || MAS || align=right data-sort-value="0.85" | 850 m || 
|-id=909 bgcolor=#fefefe
| 368909 ||  || — || October 11, 2006 || Kitt Peak || Spacewatch || — || align=right data-sort-value="0.79" | 790 m || 
|-id=910 bgcolor=#fefefe
| 368910 ||  || — || October 11, 2006 || Palomar || NEAT || V || align=right data-sort-value="0.73" | 730 m || 
|-id=911 bgcolor=#fefefe
| 368911 ||  || — || October 12, 2006 || Palomar || NEAT || — || align=right | 1.2 km || 
|-id=912 bgcolor=#fefefe
| 368912 ||  || — || October 13, 2006 || Kitt Peak || Spacewatch || — || align=right data-sort-value="0.83" | 830 m || 
|-id=913 bgcolor=#fefefe
| 368913 ||  || — || October 15, 2006 || Kitt Peak || Spacewatch || NYS || align=right data-sort-value="0.56" | 560 m || 
|-id=914 bgcolor=#d6d6d6
| 368914 ||  || — || October 16, 2006 || Kitt Peak || Spacewatch || 3:2 || align=right | 4.7 km || 
|-id=915 bgcolor=#fefefe
| 368915 ||  || — || October 17, 2006 || Kitt Peak || Spacewatch || V || align=right data-sort-value="0.65" | 650 m || 
|-id=916 bgcolor=#fefefe
| 368916 ||  || — || October 16, 2006 || Kitt Peak || Spacewatch || MAS || align=right data-sort-value="0.74" | 740 m || 
|-id=917 bgcolor=#fefefe
| 368917 ||  || — || October 17, 2006 || Kitt Peak || Spacewatch || NYS || align=right data-sort-value="0.79" | 790 m || 
|-id=918 bgcolor=#fefefe
| 368918 ||  || — || October 17, 2006 || Mount Lemmon || Mount Lemmon Survey || MAS || align=right data-sort-value="0.73" | 730 m || 
|-id=919 bgcolor=#fefefe
| 368919 ||  || — || October 19, 2006 || Kitt Peak || Spacewatch || — || align=right data-sort-value="0.75" | 750 m || 
|-id=920 bgcolor=#fefefe
| 368920 ||  || — || October 4, 2006 || Mount Lemmon || Mount Lemmon Survey || — || align=right data-sort-value="0.80" | 800 m || 
|-id=921 bgcolor=#fefefe
| 368921 ||  || — || September 17, 2006 || Catalina || CSS || — || align=right data-sort-value="0.80" | 800 m || 
|-id=922 bgcolor=#fefefe
| 368922 ||  || — || October 20, 2006 || Kitt Peak || Spacewatch || MAS || align=right data-sort-value="0.74" | 740 m || 
|-id=923 bgcolor=#fefefe
| 368923 ||  || — || October 27, 2006 || Catalina || CSS || FLO || align=right data-sort-value="0.88" | 880 m || 
|-id=924 bgcolor=#d6d6d6
| 368924 ||  || — || October 28, 2006 || Kitt Peak || Spacewatch || SHU3:2 || align=right | 5.2 km || 
|-id=925 bgcolor=#fefefe
| 368925 ||  || — || September 25, 2006 || Kitt Peak || Spacewatch || V || align=right data-sort-value="0.68" | 680 m || 
|-id=926 bgcolor=#fefefe
| 368926 ||  || — || October 21, 2006 || Lulin Observatory || H.-C. Lin, Q.-z. Ye || NYS || align=right data-sort-value="0.53" | 530 m || 
|-id=927 bgcolor=#fefefe
| 368927 ||  || — || November 11, 2006 || Kitt Peak || Spacewatch || NYS || align=right data-sort-value="0.75" | 750 m || 
|-id=928 bgcolor=#fefefe
| 368928 ||  || — || October 16, 2006 || Catalina || CSS || ERI || align=right | 1.5 km || 
|-id=929 bgcolor=#fefefe
| 368929 ||  || — || October 22, 2006 || Mount Lemmon || Mount Lemmon Survey || NYS || align=right data-sort-value="0.76" | 760 m || 
|-id=930 bgcolor=#fefefe
| 368930 ||  || — || August 28, 1995 || La Silla || C.-I. Lagerkvist || — || align=right | 1.0 km || 
|-id=931 bgcolor=#fefefe
| 368931 ||  || — || November 9, 2006 || Kitt Peak || Spacewatch || NYS || align=right data-sort-value="0.73" | 730 m || 
|-id=932 bgcolor=#fefefe
| 368932 ||  || — || October 20, 2006 || Mount Lemmon || Mount Lemmon Survey || — || align=right data-sort-value="0.97" | 970 m || 
|-id=933 bgcolor=#fefefe
| 368933 ||  || — || November 11, 2006 || Kitt Peak || Spacewatch || — || align=right | 1.0 km || 
|-id=934 bgcolor=#fefefe
| 368934 ||  || — || September 28, 2006 || Mount Lemmon || Mount Lemmon Survey || MAS || align=right data-sort-value="0.78" | 780 m || 
|-id=935 bgcolor=#fefefe
| 368935 ||  || — || November 14, 2006 || Kitt Peak || Spacewatch || critical || align=right data-sort-value="0.65" | 650 m || 
|-id=936 bgcolor=#fefefe
| 368936 ||  || — || November 15, 2006 || Mount Lemmon || Mount Lemmon Survey || — || align=right data-sort-value="0.91" | 910 m || 
|-id=937 bgcolor=#fefefe
| 368937 ||  || — || November 8, 2006 || Palomar || NEAT || MAS || align=right data-sort-value="0.63" | 630 m || 
|-id=938 bgcolor=#fefefe
| 368938 ||  || — || November 18, 2006 || Kitt Peak || Spacewatch || — || align=right | 1.1 km || 
|-id=939 bgcolor=#fefefe
| 368939 ||  || — || September 19, 2006 || Catalina || CSS || — || align=right | 1.1 km || 
|-id=940 bgcolor=#fefefe
| 368940 ||  || — || August 13, 2002 || Palomar || NEAT || — || align=right | 1.1 km || 
|-id=941 bgcolor=#fefefe
| 368941 ||  || — || November 20, 2006 || Kitt Peak || Spacewatch || — || align=right data-sort-value="0.86" | 860 m || 
|-id=942 bgcolor=#fefefe
| 368942 ||  || — || November 18, 2006 || Mount Lemmon || Mount Lemmon Survey || — || align=right data-sort-value="0.85" | 850 m || 
|-id=943 bgcolor=#fefefe
| 368943 ||  || — || November 20, 2006 || Kitt Peak || Spacewatch || NYS || align=right data-sort-value="0.84" | 840 m || 
|-id=944 bgcolor=#fefefe
| 368944 ||  || — || November 23, 2006 || Kitt Peak || Spacewatch || — || align=right data-sort-value="0.88" | 880 m || 
|-id=945 bgcolor=#fefefe
| 368945 ||  || — || November 27, 2006 || Mount Lemmon || Mount Lemmon Survey || H || align=right data-sort-value="0.83" | 830 m || 
|-id=946 bgcolor=#fefefe
| 368946 ||  || — || December 9, 2006 || Palomar || NEAT || — || align=right | 1.00 km || 
|-id=947 bgcolor=#fefefe
| 368947 ||  || — || December 14, 2006 || Kitt Peak || Spacewatch || NYS || align=right data-sort-value="0.77" | 770 m || 
|-id=948 bgcolor=#E9E9E9
| 368948 ||  || — || December 14, 2006 || Kitt Peak || Spacewatch || — || align=right | 1.5 km || 
|-id=949 bgcolor=#FFC2E0
| 368949 ||  || — || December 16, 2006 || Palomar || NEAT || AMO || align=right data-sort-value="0.42" | 420 m || 
|-id=950 bgcolor=#fefefe
| 368950 ||  || — || December 16, 2006 || Kitt Peak || Spacewatch || MAS || align=right data-sort-value="0.75" | 750 m || 
|-id=951 bgcolor=#fefefe
| 368951 ||  || — || December 22, 2006 || Socorro || LINEAR || MAS || align=right data-sort-value="0.76" | 760 m || 
|-id=952 bgcolor=#E9E9E9
| 368952 ||  || — || January 8, 2007 || Mount Lemmon || Mount Lemmon Survey || — || align=right data-sort-value="0.92" | 920 m || 
|-id=953 bgcolor=#E9E9E9
| 368953 ||  || — || January 9, 2007 || Catalina || CSS || — || align=right | 1.2 km || 
|-id=954 bgcolor=#E9E9E9
| 368954 ||  || — || January 15, 2007 || Catalina || CSS || EUN || align=right | 1.4 km || 
|-id=955 bgcolor=#E9E9E9
| 368955 ||  || — || January 15, 2007 || Catalina || CSS || — || align=right | 1.1 km || 
|-id=956 bgcolor=#E9E9E9
| 368956 ||  || — || January 16, 2007 || Socorro || LINEAR || — || align=right | 2.3 km || 
|-id=957 bgcolor=#E9E9E9
| 368957 ||  || — || January 16, 2007 || Socorro || LINEAR || — || align=right | 1.1 km || 
|-id=958 bgcolor=#E9E9E9
| 368958 ||  || — || January 16, 2007 || Mount Lemmon || Mount Lemmon Survey || — || align=right | 1.1 km || 
|-id=959 bgcolor=#fefefe
| 368959 ||  || — || January 17, 2007 || Palomar || NEAT || — || align=right | 1.2 km || 
|-id=960 bgcolor=#E9E9E9
| 368960 ||  || — || January 24, 2007 || Nyukasa || Mount Nyukasa Stn. || XIZ || align=right | 1.3 km || 
|-id=961 bgcolor=#E9E9E9
| 368961 ||  || — || January 9, 2007 || Mount Lemmon || Mount Lemmon Survey || — || align=right | 1.6 km || 
|-id=962 bgcolor=#E9E9E9
| 368962 ||  || — || December 24, 2006 || Catalina || CSS || JUN || align=right | 1.3 km || 
|-id=963 bgcolor=#fefefe
| 368963 ||  || — || January 24, 2007 || Catalina || CSS || H || align=right data-sort-value="0.52" | 520 m || 
|-id=964 bgcolor=#E9E9E9
| 368964 ||  || — || January 27, 2007 || Mount Lemmon || Mount Lemmon Survey || — || align=right | 2.8 km || 
|-id=965 bgcolor=#fefefe
| 368965 ||  || — || January 27, 2007 || Siding Spring || SSS || H || align=right | 1.2 km || 
|-id=966 bgcolor=#E9E9E9
| 368966 ||  || — || January 27, 2007 || Kitt Peak || Spacewatch || MAR || align=right | 1.3 km || 
|-id=967 bgcolor=#E9E9E9
| 368967 ||  || — || January 25, 2007 || Catalina || CSS || EUN || align=right | 1.7 km || 
|-id=968 bgcolor=#E9E9E9
| 368968 ||  || — || February 5, 2007 || Palomar || NEAT || — || align=right | 1.3 km || 
|-id=969 bgcolor=#E9E9E9
| 368969 ||  || — || February 6, 2007 || Mount Lemmon || Mount Lemmon Survey || — || align=right | 2.4 km || 
|-id=970 bgcolor=#E9E9E9
| 368970 ||  || — || December 26, 2006 || Kitt Peak || Spacewatch || — || align=right data-sort-value="0.97" | 970 m || 
|-id=971 bgcolor=#E9E9E9
| 368971 ||  || — || November 1, 2006 || Mount Lemmon || Mount Lemmon Survey || — || align=right data-sort-value="0.98" | 980 m || 
|-id=972 bgcolor=#E9E9E9
| 368972 ||  || — || February 6, 2007 || Mount Lemmon || Mount Lemmon Survey || — || align=right | 1.5 km || 
|-id=973 bgcolor=#E9E9E9
| 368973 ||  || — || February 8, 2007 || Palomar || NEAT || — || align=right | 2.4 km || 
|-id=974 bgcolor=#E9E9E9
| 368974 ||  || — || February 10, 2007 || Catalina || CSS || JUN || align=right | 1.2 km || 
|-id=975 bgcolor=#E9E9E9
| 368975 ||  || — || January 25, 2007 || Catalina || CSS || MAR || align=right | 1.3 km || 
|-id=976 bgcolor=#E9E9E9
| 368976 ||  || — || February 17, 2007 || Kitt Peak || Spacewatch || — || align=right | 2.3 km || 
|-id=977 bgcolor=#E9E9E9
| 368977 ||  || — || March 9, 2007 || Mount Lemmon || Mount Lemmon Survey || — || align=right | 2.7 km || 
|-id=978 bgcolor=#E9E9E9
| 368978 ||  || — || February 10, 2007 || Catalina || CSS || HNS || align=right | 1.3 km || 
|-id=979 bgcolor=#E9E9E9
| 368979 ||  || — || March 11, 2007 || Catalina || CSS || — || align=right | 2.8 km || 
|-id=980 bgcolor=#E9E9E9
| 368980 ||  || — || March 10, 2007 || Kitt Peak || Spacewatch || — || align=right | 2.2 km || 
|-id=981 bgcolor=#E9E9E9
| 368981 ||  || — || February 26, 2007 || Mount Lemmon || Mount Lemmon Survey || — || align=right | 1.5 km || 
|-id=982 bgcolor=#fefefe
| 368982 ||  || — || March 14, 2007 || Catalina || CSS || H || align=right data-sort-value="0.62" | 620 m || 
|-id=983 bgcolor=#E9E9E9
| 368983 ||  || — || March 9, 2007 || Kitt Peak || Spacewatch || — || align=right data-sort-value="0.91" | 910 m || 
|-id=984 bgcolor=#E9E9E9
| 368984 ||  || — || March 9, 2007 || Mount Lemmon || Mount Lemmon Survey || — || align=right | 1.7 km || 
|-id=985 bgcolor=#E9E9E9
| 368985 ||  || — || March 10, 2007 || Mount Lemmon || Mount Lemmon Survey || HOF || align=right | 2.7 km || 
|-id=986 bgcolor=#E9E9E9
| 368986 ||  || — || May 28, 2003 || Kitt Peak || Spacewatch || — || align=right | 2.0 km || 
|-id=987 bgcolor=#d6d6d6
| 368987 ||  || — || March 12, 2007 || Mount Lemmon || Mount Lemmon Survey || HYG || align=right | 3.0 km || 
|-id=988 bgcolor=#E9E9E9
| 368988 ||  || — || March 14, 2007 || Mount Lemmon || Mount Lemmon Survey || EUN || align=right data-sort-value="0.90" | 900 m || 
|-id=989 bgcolor=#d6d6d6
| 368989 ||  || — || March 13, 2007 || Kitt Peak || Spacewatch || — || align=right | 2.0 km || 
|-id=990 bgcolor=#E9E9E9
| 368990 ||  || — || February 16, 2007 || Mount Lemmon || Mount Lemmon Survey || EUN || align=right | 1.5 km || 
|-id=991 bgcolor=#E9E9E9
| 368991 ||  || — || March 14, 2007 || Kitt Peak || Spacewatch || AGN || align=right | 1.3 km || 
|-id=992 bgcolor=#d6d6d6
| 368992 ||  || — || March 12, 2007 || Kitt Peak || Spacewatch || — || align=right | 4.0 km || 
|-id=993 bgcolor=#fefefe
| 368993 ||  || — || February 21, 2007 || Socorro || LINEAR || H || align=right data-sort-value="0.82" | 820 m || 
|-id=994 bgcolor=#E9E9E9
| 368994 ||  || — || March 16, 2007 || Mount Lemmon || Mount Lemmon Survey || — || align=right | 1.5 km || 
|-id=995 bgcolor=#E9E9E9
| 368995 ||  || — || March 18, 2007 || Kitt Peak || Spacewatch || — || align=right | 1.1 km || 
|-id=996 bgcolor=#E9E9E9
| 368996 ||  || — || March 19, 2007 || Anderson Mesa || LONEOS || INO || align=right | 1.5 km || 
|-id=997 bgcolor=#E9E9E9
| 368997 ||  || — || March 20, 2007 || Mount Lemmon || Mount Lemmon Survey || — || align=right | 2.8 km || 
|-id=998 bgcolor=#E9E9E9
| 368998 ||  || — || April 7, 2007 || Bergisch Gladbac || W. Bickel || — || align=right | 2.1 km || 
|-id=999 bgcolor=#d6d6d6
| 368999 ||  || — || April 14, 2007 || Kitt Peak || Spacewatch || — || align=right | 2.2 km || 
|-id=000 bgcolor=#d6d6d6
| 369000 ||  || — || April 15, 2007 || Kitt Peak || Spacewatch || — || align=right | 4.0 km || 
|}

References

External links 
 Discovery Circumstances: Numbered Minor Planets (365001)–(370000) (IAU Minor Planet Center)

0368